This list of the Paleozoic life of Nevada contains the various prehistoric life-forms whose fossilized remains have been reported from within the US state of Nevada and are between 538.8 and 252.17 million years of age.

A

 †Aatocrinus
 †Aatocrinus permicus
 †Acaciapora
 †Acaciapora duncanae – type locality for species
 †Acanthocladia
 †Acanthopecten
 †Acanthopecten coloradoensis
  †Acanthopyge
 †Achlysopsis
 †Achlysopsis hemitora
 †Achlysopsis liokata
 †Aciculolenus
 †Aciculolenus peculiaris
 †Acidiphorus
 †Acidiphorus brevis – or unidentified comparable form
 †Acidiphorus lineotuberculatus
 †Acidiphorus pseudobathurus
 †Aclisina
 †Acmarhachis
 †Acmarhachis acuta
 †Acmarhachis acutus
 †Acmarhachis typicalis
 †Acodus
 †Acodus auritus – or unidentified comparable form
 †Acontiodus
 †Acontiodus alveolaris
 †Acosarina
 †Acosarina mesoplatys
 †Acratia
 †Acratia gassanovae – or unidentified related form
 †Acratia silincula – or unidentified related form
 †Acratia subelongata
 †Acrocyathus
 †Acrospirifer
 †Acrospirifer murchisoni – or unidentified related form
 †Acrothyra
 †Actinostroma
 †Acutichiton
 †Acutichiton gracilis – type locality for species
 †Acutichiton nevadensis – type locality for species
 †Adamsoceras
 †Adamsoceras isabelae
 †Adelograptus
 †Adelograptus antiquus
 †Aechmina – tentative report
 †Aesopomum
 †Aesopomum varistriatus – or unidentified comparable form
 †Agathammina
 †Agnostocrinus
 †Agnostocrinus typus
 †Agnostotes
 †Agnostotes clavata – or unidentified comparable form
    †Agnostus
  †Agoniatites
 †Alaskospira
 †Albertella
 †Albertella aspinosa
 †Albertella eiloitys
 †Albertella fritizi – type locality for species
 †Albertella fritzi – type locality for species
 †Albertella highlandensis – type locality for species
 †Albertella judithi
 †Albertella lata – type locality for species
 †Albertella schenki – type locality for species
 †Albertella spectrensis
 †Albertellina
 †Albertellina aspinosa
 †Albertelloides – type locality for genus
 †Albertelloides kitae – type locality for species
 †Albertelloides kitai – type locality for species
 †Albertelloides mischi – type locality for species
 †Albertelloides pandispinata – type locality for species
 †Albertelloides rectimaginatus
 †Albertelloides rectimarginatus
 †Allorhynchus
 †Allorhynchus heteropsis
 †Allorisma – report made of unidentified related form or using admittedly obsolete nomenclature
 †Allosocrinus – tentative report
 †Alokistocare
 †Alokistocare alta – type locality for species
 †Alokistocarella
 †Alokistocarella brighamensis – or unidentified comparable form
 †Altiocculus
 †Altiocculus drumensis
 †Alveolites
 †Amaurotoma
 †Amaurotoma zappa – type locality for species
 †Ambocoelia
 †Ambocoelia lobata – tentative report
 †Ambocoelia recidiva
 †Ambothyris
 †Amecephalites – type locality for genus
 †Amecephalites sundbergi – type locality for species
 †Amecephalus
 †Amecephalus arrojosensis
 †Amecephalus laticaudum
 †Amorphognathus
 †Amorphognathus ordovicicus
 †Amphilichas
 †Amphilichas minganensis – or unidentified related form
 †Amphipora
 †Amphiscapha
 †Amphiscapha intermedius – type locality for species
 †Amphiscapha proxima
 †Amplexizaphrentis
 †Amplexoides
 †Amplexoides radicosi – tentative report
 †Amplifallotaspis
 †Amplifallotaspis keni
 †Ampyx – tentative report
 †Ampyx
 †Ampyxina
 †Ampyxoides
 †Ampyxoides occipitalis – or unidentified comparable form
 †Anabarella
 †Anabarella chelata – type locality for species
 †Anabolotreta
 †Anabolotreta glabra – type locality for species
 †Anabolotreta mogota – type locality for species
 † Ananias
 †Ananias nevadensis
 †Ananias seminudum – type locality for species
 †Anaphilicas – tentative report
 †Anastrophia
 †Anastrophia magnifica – or unidentified comparable form
 †Anataphrus
 †Anataphrus martinensis
 †Anataphrus spurius – or unidentified comparable form
 †Ancillotoechia
 †Ancillotoechia aptata
 †Ancillotoechia pahranagatensis
 †Anechocephalus
 †Anechocephalus spinosus
 †Anechocephalus trigranulatus
 †Anemonaria
 †Anemonaria delicatula
 Angulocellularia
 †Angulotreta
 †Anisocyamus
 †Anisopyge
 †Anisotrypa
 †Anisotrypella
 †Anolotichia
       †Anomalocaris
 †Anomalorthis
 †Anomalorthis fascicostatus – or unidentified comparable form
 †Anomalorthis fascicostellatus
 †Anomalorthis lonensis
 †Anomalorthis nevadensis
 †Anomalorthis oklahomensis
 †Anomalorthis resoi
 †Anomalorthis utahensis
 †Anomphalus
 †Anomphalus jaggerius – type locality for species
 †Anoplia
 †Anoplia elongata
 †Anostylostroma
 †Antagmus
 †Antagmus arenosus – type locality for species
 †Anthaspidella
 †Anthaspidella clintoni
 †Anthraconeilo – tentative report
 †Anthracospirifer
 †Anthracospirifer bifurcatus – or unidentified comparable form
 †Anthracospirifer birdspringensis
 †Anthracospirifer curvilateralis
 †Anthracospirifer newberryi
 †Anthracospirifer occiduus
 †Anthracospirifer opimus
 †Anthracospirifer pellaensis – or unidentified related form
 †Anticostia
 †Anticostia fastigata
 †Anticostia fastigiata
 †Anticostia festigata
 †Anticostia lata
 †Anticostia macgregorae
 †Anticostia tenuissima
 †Anticostia thorsteinssoni
 †Anticostia uniformis
 †Antiquatonia
 †Antiquatonia coloradoensis
 †Antiquatonia elyensis
 †Antiquatonia hermosana
 †Antiquatonia morrowensis
 †Antiquatonia portlockianus
 †Antirhynchonella
 †Antistrix
 †Antistrix invicta
 †Apachella
 †Apachia
 †Apachia butlerensis
 †Aparchites
 †Apatokephalus
 †Apatokephalus finalis – tentative report
 †Apatolichas
 †Apatolichas jukesi – or unidentified comparable form
 †Aphelaspis
 †Aphelaspis brachyphasis – type locality for species
 †Aphelaspis buttsi
 †Aphelaspis haguei
 †Aphelaspis subditus
 †Aphelotoxon
 †Aphelotoxon acuminata
 †Aphelotoxon marginata
 †Aphelotoxon punctata
 †Apheoorthis
 †Aphroidophyllum
 †Aphroidophyllum inceptor – type locality for species
 †Aploconus
 †Aploconus lafustei – type locality for species
 †Aporthophyla
 †Aporthophyla typa
 †Aporthophyla typica
 †Appendispinograptus
 †Appendispinograptus leptothecalis
 †Appendispinograptus longispinus
 †Appendispinograptus supernus
 †Arceodomus
 †Arceodomus glabrata
 †Arceodomus langenheimi
 †Archaediscus
 †Archaediscus krestovnikovi
 †Archaediscus moelleri – or unidentified loosely related form
   †Archaeocidaris
 †Archaeocothurnus
 †Archaeocothurnus goshutensis – type locality for species
 †Archaeocyathus
 †Archaeocyathus atlanticus – or unidentified comparable form
 †Archaeophiomusium
 †Archaeophiomusium bispinosum – type locality for species
 †Archaeophiomusium burrisi
 †Archaeorthis
 †Archaeorthis costellatus
 †Archaeorthis elongata
 †Archaeorthis elongatus
 †Archaeoscyphia
 †Archaeoscyphia bassleri – type locality for species
 †Archaeoscyphia eganensis – type locality for species
 †Archaeoscyphia pannosa – type locality for species
 †Archaeoscyphia pulchra
 †Archaeoscyphia rossi – type locality for species
 †Archaeosycon
 †Archaeosycon copulatus
 †Archinacella – tentative report
 †Arcochiton
 †Arcochiton richardsoni – type locality for species
 †Areostrophia
 †Areostrophia rara
 †Arroyocrinus
 †Arroyocrinus brachiatus
 †Arroyocrinus popenoei
 †Arrythmocricus
 †Arrythmocricus mcdamensis
 †Asaphellus
 †Asaphellus eudocia – or unidentified comparable form
 †Asaphellus riojanus
 †Asarcophyllum
 †Asarcophyllum ramosum
 †Ascopora
 †Asgardaspira
 †Asgardaspira measuresae
 †Asgardaspira yochelsoni
 †Asphaltina
 †Aspidagnostus
 †Aspidagnostus laevis – type locality for species
 †Aspidagnostus rugosus
 †Astartella
 †Astartella subquadrata
 †Asthenophyllum
 †Asthenophyllum orthoseptatum – tentative report
 †Astreptodictya
 †Astroproetus
 †Asymphylotoechia
 †Asymphylotoechia nolani
 †Atelelasma
 †Atelelasma primotica
 †Athabaskia
 †Athyridacid
 †Athyris
 †Athyris angelica
 †Athyris angelicoidea
 †Athyris lamellosa
 †Atopocystis – type locality for genus
 †Atopocystis mucronata – type locality for species
 †Atrypa
 †Atrypa nevadana
 †Atrypa parva – or unidentified comparable form
  †Atrypa reticularis
 †Atrypina
 †Atrypina erugata
 †Atrypina rugata
 †Atrypina simpsoni – type locality for species
 †Atrypoidea
 †Aulacoparia
 †Aulacoparia venta – or unidentified comparable form
 †Aulocystis
  †Aulopora
 †Auloprotonia
 †Australispongia
 †Australispongia compressa – type locality for species
 †Australophyllum – tentative report
  †Aviculopecten
 †Aviculopecten affinis
 †Aviculopecten eurekensis
 †Aviculopecten haguei
 †Aviculopecten pintoensis
 †Aviculopinna
 †Aviculopinna consimilis – or unidentified comparable form
 †Aviculopinna peracuta – tentative report
 †Avonia
 †Axofistulophyllum
 †Axofistulophyllum conulus – tentative report
 †Axofistulophyllum convexum

B

 †Bactroceras
 †Bactroceras angustisiphonatum
 Bairdia
 †Bairdia confragosaeformis – or unidentified comparable form
 †Bairdia fabaeformis – or unidentified comparable form
 †Bairdia manifesta
 †Bairdiacypris
 †Bairdiacypris anteroangulosa
 †Bairdiacypris martinae
 †Bairdiacypris quarziana
 †Bairdiocypris
 †Bakevellia
 †Ballardina
 †Ballardina simplex
 †Baltoceras
 †Baltoceras striatum – type locality for species
 †Basilicus
 †Basilicus mackeei
 †Basilicus mckeei
 †Batenevia
 †Bathymyonia
 †Bathymyonia nevadensis – type locality for species
 †Bathymyonia type locality for species A – informal
  †Bathynotus
 †Bathynotus holopygus
 †Bathyocos
 †Bathyocos housensis
 †Bathyurellus
 †Bathyurellus feitleri
 †Bathyuriscus
 †Bathyuriscus petalus
 †Bathyurus
 †Bathyurus acutus
 †Bathyurus extans – or unidentified comparable form
 †Bathyurus nevadensis
 †Bathyurus sunbloodensis
 †Batostomellina
 †Beecheria
 †Bekena
 †Bellazona
 †Bellazona bella
 †Bellefontia
  †Bellerophon
 †Bellerophon deflectus
 †Bellerophon needlensis – type locality for species
 †Bellerophon nevadensis
 †Belodella
 †Belodina
 †Belodina confluens
 †Belodina disponsa – or unidentified comparable form
 †Belodina monitorensis
 †Belodina ornata – or unidentified comparable form
 †Benthamaspis
 †Benthamaspis sera
 †Bergaueria – tentative report
 †Besselodus
 †Besselodus borealis
 †Beyrichia
 †Bicarina
 †Bicarina type locality for species A – informal
  †Biceratops – type locality for genus
 †Biceratops nevadensis – type locality for species
 †Biciragnostus
 †Biciragnostus viator
 †Bienvillia
 †Bienvillia papulosa
 †Bifida – tentative report
 †Bighornia
 † Bija
 †Bilobia
 †Bimuria
 †Blastoidocrinus
 †Blastoidocrinus nevadensis
 †Blosyropsis
 †Blountia
 †Blountia bristolensis
 †Bohemograptus
 †Bohemograptus bohemicus
 †Bojothyris
 †Bolbocephalus – tentative report
 †Bolbolenellus
 †Bolbolenellus brevispinus – type locality for species
 †Bonnia
 †Bonnia caperata – type locality for species
 †Bonnia copia – type locality for species
 †Botomaella
 †Boucotspira
 †Boucotspira antelopensis
 †Boultonia
 †Boultonia heezeni – type locality for species
 †Brachyprion
 †Brachyprion geniculata
 †Brachyprion mirabilis
 †Brachyspirifer
 †Brachyspirifer pinyonoides – type locality for species
 †Bradyfallotaspis
 †Bradyphyllum
 †Bradyphyllum gracilium – type locality for species
 †Bransonia
 †Brasilioproductus
 †Brasilioproductus welleri – or unidentified comparable form
 †Brevibelus
 †Brevibelus breviformis
 †Breviphrentis
 †Breviphrentis invaginata
 †Breviphrentis invaginatus
 †Breviphrentis johnsoni
 †Breviphrentis kirki
 †Breviphrentis magna
 †Briantia
 †Briantia mulleri
   †Bristolia
 †Bristolia anteros
 †Bristolia bristolensis
 †Bristolia fragilis
 †Broeggeria – tentative report
 †Bromella
 †Bromella veritas
 †Brongniartella
 †Brunsia
 †Budnaniella
 †Budnaniella shenandoense – or unidentified comparable form
  †Bumastus
 †Buxtonia
 †Buxtonia websteri – type locality for species
 †Bynumina
 †Bynumina globosa
 †Bythicheilus
 Bythocypris

C

 †Caborcella
 †Caborcella clinolimbata – type locality for species
 †Caborcella ganosa
 †Caborcella granosa
 †Caborcella pseudaulax
 †Caborcella reducta
 †Cabrieroceras
 †Cabrieroceras crispiforme – or unidentified related form
 †Calathium
 †Calcispheara
 †Calcitornella
 †Calcivertella
 †Caliendrum – or unidentified related form
 †Calliprotonia
 †Calliprotonia spinula – type locality for species
 †Calstevenus – type locality for genus
 †Calstevenus arcturus – type locality for species
 †Calycalyptella
 †Calycocoelia
 †Calycocoelia murella – type locality for species
 †Calycocoelia typicalis
 †Calygirtyoceras
 †Calygirtyoceras arcticum
  †Calymene
 †Calyptaulax
 †Calyptaulax callirachis – or unidentified comparable form
 †Camarotoechia
 †Camarotoechia modica – or unidentified comparable form
 †Camarotoechia pahranagatensis
 †Camarotoechia vesper
 †Camerella
   †Canadaspis
 †Canadiphyllum
 †Cancelloceras
 †Cancelloceras elegans – or unidentified comparable form
 †Cancrinella
 †Caninia
 †Caninia elkoensis – type locality for species
 †Caninia goldcreekensis – type locality for species
 †Caninia torquia
 †Caninostrotion
 †Canthylotreta
 †Canthylotreta crista – type locality for species
 †Cardiomorpha
 †Carinagypa
 †Carinamala
 †Carinamala longispina – type locality for species
 †Carlinastraea
 †Carlinastraea halysitoides
 †Carolinites
 †Carolinites ekphymosus – or unidentified comparable form
 †Carolinites genacinaca
 †Carolinites killaryensis – or unidentified comparable form
 †Carolinites sibiricus
 †Carrickia
 †Cassidirostrum
 †Cassidirostrum eurekaensis – or unidentified comparable form
 †Cassidirostrum vexans – type locality for species
 †Catazona – type locality for genus
 †Catazona rudilirata – type locality for species
 †Catazone
 †Catazone nevadana – type locality for species
  †Catenipora
 †Catoraphiceras
 †Catoraphiceras foerstei
  †Cavusgnathus
 †Cavusgnathus gigantus
 †Cavusgnathus lautus
 †Cavusgnathus spathus
  †Cedaria
 †Cedaria brevifrons – type locality for species
 †Celonocrinus
 †Celonocrinus expansus
 †Cenorhynchia
 †Cenorhynchia type locality for species A – informal
 †Cenorhynchia type locality for species B – informal
 †Centropleura
 †Ceratocephala – tentative report
 †Ceratoikiscum – tentative report
 †Ceratopea
 †Ceratopea latiumbilicata – or unidentified comparable form
 †Ceratopea lemonei
 †Ceraurinella
 †Ceraurinus
 †Ceraurinus icarus
  †Ceraurus
 †Cernuolimbus
 †Cernuolimbus depressus
 †Cernuolimbus granulosus
 †Cernuolimbus laevifrons
 †Cernuolimbus orygmatos
 †Cernuolimbus semigranulosus
 †Chaetetes
 †Chaetetes milleporaceus
 †Chalaroschwagerina
 †Chalaroschwagerina ampla – type locality for species
 †Chalaroschwagerina eximia – type locality for species
 †Chalaroschwagerina formosa – type locality for species
 †Chalaroschwagerina globularis – type locality for species
 †Chalaroschwagerina inflata – type locality for species
 †Chalaroschwagerina solita – type locality for species
 †Chalaroschwagerina tumentis
  †Chancelloria
 †Chancia
 †Chancia maladensis – tentative report
 †Chancia venusta
 †Chancia venuxa – or unidentified comparable form
 †Chanciaopsis
 †Chanciaopsis heteromorphos
 †Charchaqia
 †Charchaqia norini
 †Chaulistomella – tentative report
 †Chazydictya
 †Cheilocephalus
 †Cheilocephalus brachyops
 †Cheilocephalus brevilobus
 †Cheilocephalus granulosus
 †Chonetes
 †Chonetes euampygus
 †Chonetes logani
 †Choperella
 †Choperella jeanette
 †Choristites
 †Choristites orbitus – type locality for species
 †Cibolocrinus
 †Cibolocrinus typus
  †Cladochonus
 †Cladochonus nevadensis – type locality for species
 †Cladochonus shawi – type locality for species
  †Cladodus
 †Cladopora
 †Clathronema
 †Clathronema batteni – type locality for species
 †Clathrospira
 †Cleiothyrdina
 †Cleiothyrdina orbicularis
  †Cleiothyridina
 †Cleiothyridina angelicoides – or unidentified comparable form
 †Cleiothyridina ciriacksi
 †Cleiothyridina deroissyi
 †Cleiothyridina elegans
 †Cleiothyridina milleri
 †Cleiothyridina orbicularis
 †Cleiothyridina pecosii
 †Cleiothyridina pecossi – or unidentified comparable form
 †Cleiothyridina reticulata
 †Cleiothyridina type locality for species A – informal
 †Cleiothyridina type locality for species B – informal
 †Clelandia – tentative report
 †Climacammina
 †Climacammina patula – or unidentified loosely related form
 †Climacammina prisca – or unidentified loosely related form
  †Climacograptus
 †Climacograptus caudatus
 †Climacograptus hastatus
 †Climacograptus innotatus
 †Climacograptus phyllophorus – or unidentified comparable form
 †Climacograptus tridentatus
 †Climacograptus tubuliferus
 †Climaconus
 †Clinopistha
 †Clinopistha levis
 †Clisiophyllum
 †Clisospira
  †Cloacaspis
 †Cloacaspis tesselata
 †Clonopora – tentative report
 †Cnemidactis
 †Cnemidactis macroadambulacralatas – type locality for species
 †Coelospira
 †Coelospira concava
 †Coelospira pseudocamilla – type locality for species
 †Colaptomena
 †Coledium
 †Coledium therum
 †Coleoloides
 †Coleoloides inyoensis – type locality for species
 †Colinispongia
 †Colinispongia regularis – type locality for species
 †Colpites
 †Columnaria
 †Comanchia
 †Comanchia minus
  †Composita
 †Composita apheles – or unidentified comparable form
 †Composita gibbosa
 †Composita mexicana
 †Composita mira
 †Composita ovata
 †Composita parasulcata
 †Composita subquadrata
 †Composita subtilita
 †Composita trilobata
 †Composita trilobita
 †Composita trinuclea
 †Compsonema – type locality for genus
 †Compsonema fragile – type locality for species
 †Conchidium
 †Conchopeltus
 †Conocardium
 †Conotoma
 †Conotoma aurora
 †Conotreta
  †Constellaria
 †Contignatiospongia – type locality for genus
 †Contignatiospongia nevadensis – type locality for species
 †Conularia
 †Cooleyella
 †Cooleyella duffini
 †Coosia
 †Coosia longocula – type locality for species
 †Cordillerastraea
 †Cordillerastraea complexa
 †Cordillerastraea nevadaensis – type locality for species
 †Cordillerastraea nevadensis
 †Cordylodus
 †Cordylodus angulatus
 †Cordylodus intermedius
 †Cordylodus lindstomi
 †Cordylodus proavus
 †Cornuodus
 Cornuspira
 †Cornwallatia – type locality for genus
 †Cornwallatia tabularia – type locality for species
 †Cortezorthis
 †Cortezorthis cortezensis – type locality for species
 †Corydylodus
 †Corynexochides
 †Corynexochides prolatus
 †Corynexochoides
 †Corynexochoides prolatus
 †Costatumulus
 †Costatumulus altissima
 †Costellarina
 †Costellarina kaasai
 †Costellarina plasi
 †Costipelagiella
 †Costipelagiella nevadense – type locality for species
 †Costispirifer
 †Cothurnocysts
 †Cothurnocysts saukia – type locality for species
 †Cranaena
 †Crassialveolites
 †Crassialveolites dubatalovi – or unidentified comparable form
 †Crassifimbra
 †Crassifimbra walcotti
 †Cravenoceras
 †Cravenoceras friscoense
 †Crenispirifer – tentative report
 †Crimites
 †Crimites elkoensis – type locality for species
 †Criteriognathus
 †Criteriognathus eurekaensis
 †Crurithyris
 †Crurithyris calendae
 †Crurithyris expansa
 †Crurithyris fissa – type locality for species
 †Crurithyris planoconvexa
 †Crurithyris wampensis
 †Cryptolithoides
 †Cryptolithoides fittsi
 †Cryptolithoides reticulatus
 †Cryptolithus
 †Cryptophyllus
 †Ctenalosia
 †Ctenalosia fixata
 †Ctenodonta
 †Culumbodina
 †Culumbodina occidentalis
 †Culumbodine
 †Culumbodine penna
 †Cuparius
 †Cuparius cardilatus
 †Curtoceras
 †Cyathaxonia
 †Cyathophycus
 †Cyathophycus pseudoreticulatus – type locality for species
 †Cyathophycus reticulatus – tentative report
 †Cyathophyllum
 †Cyathophyllum eurekaense
 †Cybeloides
 †Cybelopsis
 †Cybelurus
 †Cybelurus halo
 †Cymbidium
 †Cypricardella
 †Cypricardella connata
 †Cypricardella striata – or unidentified related form
 †Cypricardinia
 †Cypricardinia moorefieldana – or unidentified related form
 †Cyptendoceras
 †Cyptendoceras kirki – type locality for species
 †Cyptendoceras rhythmicum – type locality for species
 †Cyrtia
 †Cyrtina
 †Cyrtina caroline
 †Cyrtina neogenes
 †Cyrtina varia – or unidentified comparable form
 †Cyrtinaella
 †Cyrtinaella causa – type locality for species
 †Cyrtinoides
 †Cyrtinoides septata
 †Cyrtoniodus
 †Cyrtoniodus flexuosus
 †Cyrtonotella
 †Cyrtonotella fasciculata – or unidentified related form
 †Cyrtorostra
  †Cyrtospirifer
 †Cyrtospirifer breviposticus
 †Cyrtospirifer portae – or unidentified comparable form
 †Cyrtospirifer whitneyi
 †Cyrtothoracoceras
 †Cystiphylloides
 †Cystodictya
 †Cytherellina
 †Cytherellina obusa

D

 †Dactyletes
 †Dactylogonia
 †Dactylogonia vespertina
 †Dactylotreta
 †Dactylotreta elegantula – type locality for species
 †Dalejina
   †Dalmanites
 †Dapsilodus
 †Dapsilodus obliquicostatus
 †Daraelites
 †Daraelites leonardensis
 †Davidsonia
 †Davidsonia antelopensis
 †Deceptrix
 †Dechenella
 †Decoranewsomites
 †Decoranewsomites angelicus
 †Decoriconus
 †Decoriconus fragilis
 †Decorospira – type locality for genus
 †Decorospira rigbyi – type locality for species
 †Delamarella – type locality for genus
 †Delamarella breispinaspis
 †Delamarella brevispinaspis – type locality for species
 †Delaria
 †Delaria sevilloidia
 †Delaria snowi
 †Dellea – tentative report
 †Dellea punctata
 †Delmarella – type locality for genus
 †Delmarella brevispinaspis – type locality for species
 †Delocrinus
 †Delocrinus graphicus – or unidentified related form
 †Delocrinus vastus
 †Delthyris
 †Denayella
 †Denayella housei – type locality for species
 Dentalium
 †Derbyia
 †Derbyia crassa
 †Derbyia subcircularis
 †Derbyia sulca
 †Derbyia wabaunseensis
 †Desatrypa
 †Desatrypa copperi
 †Desmoinesia
 †Desmoinesia ingrata
 †Desmoinesia nana
 †Desmorthis
 †Desmorthis costata
 †Desmorthis crassus
 †Desmorthis nevadensis
 †Desmorthis planus
 †Devonalosia – tentative report
 †Devonoproductus
 †Devonoproductus hallanus
 †Devonoproductus minimus – or unidentified comparable form
 †Diacanthaspis – tentative report
 †Dianulites
 †Diaphragmaphyllum
 †Diaphragmaphyllum grossum – or unidentified related form
 †Diaphragmus
 †Diaphragmus phillipsi
 †Dicanthopyge
 †Dicanthopyge convergens
 †Dicanthopyge quadrata
 †Dicanthopyge reductus
 †Dicellograptus
 †Dicellograptus alector – type locality for species
 †Dicellograptus anceps
 †Dicellograptus complanatus
 †Dicellograptus divaricatus – or unidentified comparable form
 †Dicellograptus minor
 †Dicellograptus mirabilis
 †Dicellograptus ornatus
 †Dicellograptus sextans
 †Dicellograptus tumidus
 †Dicellograptus turgidus
 †Diceratograptus
 †Diceratograptus mirus
 †Diceromyonia
 †Diceromyonia ignota
 †Dichognathus
 †Dichognathus typica
 †Dichogranthus
 †Dicoelosia
 †Dicoelosia biloba
 †Dicranograptus
 †Dictyoclostus
 †Dictyonema
 †Dictytonina
 †Dictytonina pannula
  †Didymograptus
 †Didymograptus artus
 †Didymograptus protobifidus
 †Dielasma
 †Dielasma diabloense – or unidentified comparable form
 †Dielasma phosphoriense
 †Dimegelasma
 †Dimegelasma eurekensis – type locality for species
 †Dimeropyge – tentative report
 †Dimeropygiella
 †Dimeropygiella caudanodosa
 †Dimeropygiella ovata
 †Dimorphoceras
 †Dinorthis
 †Dinorthis occidentalis
 †Diparelasma
 †Diparelasma typicum – or unidentified comparable form
 †Diplocyathellus
  †Diplograptus
 †Diplograptus rarithecatus
 †Diplograptus rigidus
 †Diplotrypa
 †Discomyorthis
 †Discomyorthis musculosa
 †Disphyllum
 †Distacodus
 †Distacodus symmetricus
 †Distomodus
 †Divaricospongia – type locality for genus
 †Divaricospongia dilata – type locality for species
 †Dokimocephalus
 †Dokimocephalus pernasutus
 †Dolerorthis
 †Dolerorthis flabellites
 †Donaldiella
 †Donaldiella cicelia
 †Donaldina
 †Donaldospira
 †Donaldospira geminocarinata – or unidentified comparable form
 †Dorlodotia
 †Dorytreta – tentative report
 †Drepanodus
 †Drepanodus subarcuatus
 †Drepanoistodus
 †Drepanoistodus deltife
 †Drepanoistodus suberectus
 †Droharhynchia
 †Droharhynchia intermissa
 †Dunbarella
 †Dunderbergia
 †Dunderbergia anyta
 †Dunderbergia bigranulosa
 †Dunderbergia brevispina
 †Dunderbergia calculosa
 †Dunderbergia nitida
 †Dunderbergia polybothra
 †Dunderbergia variagranula
 †Durhamina
 †Durhamina cordillerensis – type locality for species
 †Durhamina moormanensis – type locality for species
 †Durhamina primitiva – type locality for species
 †Durhamina richi
 †Durhamina snyderi – type locality for species
 †Durhamina sublaeve
 †Dvorakia
 †Dyoros
 †Dyoros nevadaensis – type locality for species
 †Dyoros type locality for species A – informal
 †Dyscritella
 †Dyscritella acanthostylia – type locality for species
 †Dyticospirifer – type locality for genus
 †Dyticospirifer mccolleyensis – type locality for species
 †Dytremacephalus
 †Dytremacephalus asperaxis
 †Dytremacephalus granulosus

E

 †Earlandia
 †Earlandia vulgaris
 †Ecculiomphalus
 †Ecculiomphalus harrisae
 †Eccyliopterus
 Echidnina
 †Echidnina bengstoni – type locality for species
 †Echinalosia
 †Echinalosia type locality for species A – informal
 †Echinaria
 †Echinaria knighti
 †Echinaria semipunctata – or unidentified comparable form
 †Echinauris
 †Echinauris magna
 †Echinauris subhorrida – type locality for species
 †Echinocoelia
 †Echinocoelia careocamera
 †Echinocoelia denayensis
 †Echinocoelia williamsi
 †Echinoconchus
 †Echinoconchus biseriatus – or unidentified related form
 †Echinoconchus elegans
 †Echinoconchus semipunctatus
 †Echinoconchus vittatus – or unidentified related form
 †Ecnomiophyllum – type locality for genus
 †Ecnomiophyllum fascis – type locality for species
 †Ecnomiophyllum merriami – type locality for species
 †Ecnomiophyllum simpsoni
 †Ectenonotus
 †Ectenonotus westoni – or unidentified comparable form
 †Ectenonotus whittingtoni
 †Ectenonotus whittingtonia
 †Ectenotus – tentative report
 †Ectoprimitia
 †Edmondia
 †Egania – type locality for genus
 †Egania typicalis – type locality for species
 †Egorovia
 †Egorovia longituda – or unidentified related form
 †Egosiella – tentative report
 †Ehmaniella
 †Ehmaniella angustigena
 †Ehmaniella fronsplanata
 †Ekeraspis
 †Ekeraspis floweri
 †Ekeraspis nevadensis
 †Ekteinocrinus
 †Ekteinocrinus battleshipensis
 †Ekvasophyllum
 †Elassocrinus
 †Elassocrinus cyathus
 †Elassocrinus delicatulus
 †Elassocrinus inornatus
 †Elassocrinus nodosus
 †Elburgia
 †Elburgia granulosa
 †Elburgia quinnensis
 †Eleutherokomma
 †Eleutherokomma impennis – or unidentified comparable form
 †Eleutherospira
 †Eleutherospira sinistralis – type locality for species
 †Elibatocrinus
 †Elibatocrinus elongatus
 †Eliorhynchus
 †Eliorhynchus castanea
 †Eliorhynchus nevadensis
 †Elita
 †Elkoceras – type locality for genus
 †Elkoceras volborthi – type locality for species
 †Elliottella
 †Elliottella multicostata – or unidentified related form
 †Elrathina
 †Elrathina antiqua
 †Elrathina wheelera
 †Elvania
 †Elvinia
 †Elvinia roemeri
 †Elviniella
 †Elviniella laevis
 †Elythyna
 †Emanuella
 †Emanuella meristoides
 †Embolophyllum
 †Embolophyllum carbonense – type locality for species
 †Emmonsia
 †Enantiosphenella
 †Enantiosphenella cybele
 †Encrinuroides
  †Encrinurus
 †Endelocrinus
 †Endelocrinus torus
 †Endophyllum
 †Endothyra
 †Endothyra bowmani – or unidentified related form
 †Endothyra excellens
 †Endothyra maxima
 †Endothyra pandorae
 †Endothyra phrissa
 †Endothyra prisca – or unidentified loosely related form
 †Endothyra tantala
 †Endothyranella
 †Endothyranopsis
 †Endothyranopsis compressus
 †Endothyranopsis crassus
 †Endothyranopsis scitula
 †Endymionia
 †Endymionia meeki – or unidentified comparable form
 †Entactinia
 †Entactinia spongia – tentative report
 †Entactinia sublata – or unidentified related form
 †Enteletes
 †Entogonites
 †Eoangyomphalus
 †Eoangyomphalus klapperi – type locality for species
 †Eochonetes
 †Eoendothyrandopsis
 †Eoendothyranopsis
 †Eoendothyranopsis donica
 †Eoendothyranopsis ermakiensis
 †Eoendothyranopsis robusta – or unidentified related form
 †Eoendothyranopsis scitula
 †Eofallotaspis – or unidentified comparable form
 †Eofalodus
 †Eofalodus brevis
 †Eofletcheria
 †Eoglossinotoechia
 †Eokochaspis – type locality for genus
 †Eokochaspis cabinensis
 †Eokochaspis delamarensis
 †Eokochaspis granulosa – type locality for species
 †Eokochaspis longspina
 †Eokochaspis metalaspis – type locality for species
 †Eokochaspis nodosa – type locality for species
 †Eokochaspis piochensis
 †Eoleperditia
 †Eoleperditia bivia
 †Eolissochonetes
 †Eolissochonetes keyesi
 †Eomarginifera
 †Eomarginifera haydensis – or unidentified comparable form
 †Eoparafusulina
 †Eoparafusulina bellula – type locality for species
 †Eoparafusulina concisa – type locality for species
 †Eoparafusulina spissa
 †Eoplectodona
 †Eoplectodonta
 †Eoplectodonta alternata
 †Eopteria
 †Eopteria richardsoni – or unidentified comparable form
 †Eoptychoparia – or unidentified comparable form
 †Eoptychoparia piochensis
 †Eorobergia
 †Eoschubertella
 †Eoschuchertella
 †Eospirifer
 †Eostaffella
 †Eostaffella tortula
 †Eotetragraptus
 †Eothele
 †Eothele spurri
 †Eotuberitina
 †Epiphyton
 †Epiphyton pencillatum – or unidentified comparable form
 †Epistacheoides
 †Eridoconcha
 †Eridopora
 †Eriella – tentative report
 †Erisocrinus
 †Erisocrinus longwelli
 †Erixanium
 †Erixanium brachyaxis
 †Erixanium carinatum
 †Erixanium multisegmentus
 †Eroicaspira
 †Eroicaspira simulatrix
 †Esmeraldina
 †Esmeraldina cometes – type locality for species
 †Esmeraldina elliptica
 †Esmeraldina lidensis – type locality for species
 †Esmeraldina rowei
  †Ethmophyllum
 †Euconia – tentative report
 †Eugonophyllum
 †Eukrinaster
 †Eukrinaster ibexensis
 †Eumetria
 †Eumetria acutirostra – or unidentified comparable form
 †Eumorphoceras
 †Eumorphoceras bisulcatum
  †Euomphalus
 †Euomphalus latus
 †Euomphalus pancakensis – type locality for species
 †Euphemites
 †Euphemites crenulatus
 †Euphemites kingi
 †Euphemites nevadensis – type locality for species
 †Euphemitopsis
 †Euphemitopsis subpapillosa
 †Euptychaspis
 †Eurekablastus – type locality for genus
 †Eurekablastus ninemilensis – type locality for species
 †Eurekaspirifer – type locality for genus
 †Eurekaspirifer pinyonensis
 †Eurekia
 †Eurychilina
 †Euryzone – tentative report
 †Eustypocystis
 †Eustypocystis minor
 †Evanescirostrum
 †Evanescirostrum glabraventra
 †Exochops
 †Exochops portlocki
 †Exocrinus
 †Exocrinus moorei

F

 †Faberophyllum
 †Fallotaspidia
  †Fallotaspis
 †Fallotaspis bondoni – or unidentified comparable form
   †Favosites
 †Fenestella
 †Fenestella stocktenensis
 †Fenestrellina
 †Fenestrocyathus
 †Ferganella
 †Ferganella borealis
 †Fieldaspis
 †Fieldaspis bilobata
 †Fieldaspis celer
 †Fieldaspis superba
 †Fimbrinia
 †Fimbrinia plummeri
 †Finkelnburgia – tentative report
 †Finkelnburgia scenidioides – or unidentified comparable form
 †Fistellaspongia – type locality for genus
 †Fistellaspongia inclinata – type locality for species
 †Fistulipora
 †Fistulipora bifoliatus
 †Fistutlipora
 †Fistutlipora lamellatis
 †Flabellitesia
 †Flabellitesia flabellites
 †Flexaria
 †Flexaria arkansana
  †Flexicalymene
 †Fomichevella
 †Fomichevella nevadensis – type locality for species
 †Fomichevella schrenki
 †Fomichevella waltersi – type locality for species
 †Fremontia
 †Freontia
 †Fritzaspis
 †Fritzaspis generalis
 †Fritzaspis ovalis
 †Fusulinella
 †Fusulinella acuminata
 †Fusulinella fugax

G

 †Gabelia – type locality for genus
 †Gabelia fascicula
 †Gabelia giganta
 †Gabelia intermedia – type locality for species
 †Gabelia pedunculus – type locality for species
 †Gacella – tentative report
 †Gallatinospongia
 †Gallatinospongia conica
 †Gamachignathus
 †Gamachignathus ensifer
 †Gasterocoma
 †Gasterocoma bicaula – type locality for species
 †Gattendorfia – tentative report
 †Genalaticurus
 †Genalaticurus genalatus – or unidentified comparable form
 †Gennaeocrinus
 †Gennaeocrinus maxwelli – type locality for species
  †Geragnostus
 †Geraldinella
 †Geranocephalus
 †Geranocephalus truncatus
 †Girtyana
 †Girtyana stellara – type locality for species
 †Girtyoceras
 †Girtyoceras hamiltonense – type locality for species
 †Girtypecten
 †Girvanella
 †Glabrocingulum
 †Glabrocingulum quadrigatum
 †Glaphurochiton – tentative report
 †Glaphurus
 †Glaphyraspis
 †Glaphyraspis ornata
 †Glassia
 †Glassia triangulata
 †Globivalvulina – tentative report
 †Globoendothyra
 †Globoendothyra tomiliensis – or unidentified related form
 Glomospira
 †Glossopleura
 †Glossopleura lodensis
 †Glossopleura tuta
 †Glossopleura walcotti
 †Glyphaspis
 †Glyphaspis concavus
 †Glyptagnostus
    †Glyptagnostus reticulatus
 †Glyptograptus
 †Glyptomena – tentative report
 †Glyptorthis
 †Glyptospira
 †Glyptospira arelela – type locality for species
 †Gnathodus
 †Gnathodus muricatus
 †Gnathodus simplex – or unidentified related form
   †Gogia
 †Gogia longidactylus
 †Goldfieldia – type locality for genus
 †Goldfieldia pacifica – type locality for species
 †Goniasma
  †Goniatites
 †Goniatites americanus
 †Goniatites deceptus
 †Goniatites eganensis – type locality for species
 †Goniatites sowerbyi – type locality for species
 †Goniophrys – tentative report
 †Goniotelina
 †Goniotelina ensifer
 †Goniotrypa
 †Gosseletina – tentative report
 †Grabaulites
 †Grabaulites jacksoni – or unidentified comparable form
 †Gracianella
 †Grammatodon
 †Grammatodon politus
 †Grandaurispina – or unidentified comparable form
 †Grandaurispina type locality for species A – informal
 †Grandinasus
 †Grandinasus argentus
 †Grandinasus auricampus
 †Grandinasus patulus
 †Granulifera
 †Granulifera granulosa
 †Graphiocrinus
 †Graphiocrinus scopulus
 †Graphiodactyllis
 †Groomodiscus – type locality for genus
 †Groomodiscus rossi – type locality for species
 †Grovesella
 †Grovesella nevadensis – type locality for species
 †Grovesella tabasensis
 †Gryphochiton
 †Gryphochiton distinctus – type locality for species
 †Grypophyllum
 †Gypidula
 †Gypidula loweryi
 †Gypidula praeloweryi – type locality for species
 †Gypidula pseudogaleata – or unidentified comparable form
 †Gypidulina
 †Gypidulina Sp. C – informal
  †Gypospirifer
 †Gypospirifer infraplicus – or unidentified comparable form

H

 †Hadrocephalites
 †Hadrocephalites lyndonensis
 †Hadrocephalites rhytidodes
 †Hadropipetta
 †Hadropipetta nevadensis – type locality for species
 †Hadrorhynchia
 †Hadrorhynchia sandersoni
 †Hadrotreta
 †Hadrotreta primaaea
   †Halysites
 †Hamarodus
 †Hamarodus europaeus
 †Hammatospira – type locality for genus
 †Hammatospira bellula – type locality for species
 †Hammatostroma
 †Haplistion
 †Haplistion aeluroglossa
 †Haplistion sphaericum – or unidentified comparable form
 †Hapsiphyllum
 †Hardyoides
 †Hardyoides mimicus
 †Harklessia – type locality for genus
 †Harklessia yuenglingensis – type locality for species
 †Harpillaenus
 †Harpillaenus rossi – type locality for species
 †Hebetoechia
 †Heckethornia
 †Heckethornia bowiei
 †Heckethornia hyndeae – type locality for species
 †Heckethornia morrisseyi
 †Heckethornia numani – type locality for species
 †Hedeina
 †Hedinaspis
 †Hedinaspis regalis
 †Hedraites – tentative report
 †Heintzella
 †Heintzella davydovi – type locality for species
 †Heintzella playfordi – type locality for species
 †Heintzella radiata – or unidentified comparable form
 †Heintzella whitneyi
      †Helicoprion
 †Helicoprion bessonowi
 †Helicotis – tentative report
 †Helicotoma
 †Heliomera
 †Heliomera albata – or unidentified comparable form
 †Helminthochiton
 †Hemiarges – tentative report
 †Hemiptychina
 †Hemiptychina quadricostata
 †Heritschiella
 †Heritschiella girtyi
 †Hermatostroma
 †Hesperinia
 †Hesperinia kirki – type locality for species
 †Hesperocoelia
 †Hesperocoelia typicalis
 †Hesperomena
 †Hesperomena leptellinoidea
 †Hesperonomia
 †Hesperonomia antelopensis
 †Hesperonomia crassa – or unidentified comparable form
 †Hesperonomia iones
 †Hesperonomia nemea – or unidentified comparable form
 †Hesperonomia planidorsalis – or unidentified comparable form
 †Hesperonomiella
 †Hesperonomiella minor
 †Hesperorthis
 †Hesperorthis antelopensis – or unidentified comparable form
 †Hesperorthis matutina – or unidentified comparable form
 †Heteralosia
 †Heteralosia slocomi
 †Heterelasma
 †Heterelasma type locality for species A – informal
 †Heterocaninia – tentative report
 †Heterocaninia langenheimi
 †Heteropecten
 †Heteropecten vanvleeti
 †Heterophrentis
 †Hexatractiella
 †Hexatractiella nevadensis
 †Highgatella
 †Highgatella cordilleri
 †Hillyardina – tentative report
 †Hinganella
 †Hinganella felderi – type locality for species
 †Hintzeia
 †Hintzeia celsaora
 †Hiscobeccus
 †Hiscobeccus capax
 †Hiscobeccus gigas
 †Holcocystis
 †Holcocystis flexa
 †Holmiella
 †Holmiella falx
 †Holmiella millerensis
 †Homagnostus
 †Homagnostus comptus – type locality for species
 †Homagnostus lumidosus
 †Homagnostus obesus
 †Homograptus
 †Homotelus
 †Homotrypa
 †Housia
 †Housia ovata
 †Howellella
 †Howellella cycloptera
 †Howellella textilis – or unidentified comparable form
 †Hunnebergia – tentative report
 †Hustedia
 †Hustedia culcitula
 †Hustedia elongata
 †Hustedia gibbosa
 †Hustedia miseri
 †Hustedia mormoni – or unidentified comparable form
 †Hustedia rotundi
 †Hustedia stataria
 †Hyalostelia
 †Hyolithellus
 †Hyolithellus insolitus
    †Hyolithes
 †Hyperchilarina
 †Hypermecaspis
 †Hypermecaspis kolouros
 †Hypochilarina – tentative report
  †Hypodicranotus
 †Hypothyridina
 †Hypselentoma – tentative report
 †Hypsiptycha
 †Hypsiptycha anticostiensis – or unidentified comparable form
 †Hysterolites
 †Hystriculina
 †Hystriculina hystricula
 †Hystriculina type locality for species A – informal
 †Hystriculina wabashensis
 †Hystricurus
 †Hystricurus oculilunatus – or unidentified comparable form

I

 †Ianthinopsis
 †Iapetognathus
 †Iapetognathus sprakersi
 †Ichodella
 †Icriodus
 †Icriodus angustus – or unidentified comparable form
 †Icriodus brevis
 †Icriodus difficilis
 †Icriodus hesperius
 †Icriodus latericrescens
 †Icriodus nevadensis
 †Icriodus norfordi
 †Icriodus trojani
 †Iddingsia
 †Iddingsia robusta
 †Iddingsia similis
 †Idiomesus
 †Idiostroma
 †Idiostrophia
 †Idiostrophia conciliata
 †Idiostrophia lenticularis – type locality for species
 †Idiostrophia nuda
 †Idiostrophia paucicostata – or unidentified comparable form
 †Idiostrophia valdari – type locality for species
  †Illaenus
 †Illaenus alveatus – or unidentified comparable form
 †Illaenus auriculatus
 †Illaenus fraternus – or unidentified comparable form
 †Illaenus oscitatus – tentative report
 †Illaenus utahensis
 †Ilmenia
 †Imitoceras
 †Indivisia – tentative report
 †Inflatia
 †Ingria
 †Ingria cloudi
 †Innitagnostus
 †Innitagnostus inexpectans
 †Intomodesma – tentative report
 †Invertrypa
 †Invertrypa subnuba
 †Invertrypa talis – type locality for species
 †Iridistrophia
 †Irvingella
 †Irvingella angustilimbatus
 †Irvingella flohri
 †Irvingella major
 †Irvingella transversa
 †Isbergia
 †Ischyrophyma – tentative report
 †Ischyrotoma
 †Ischyrotoma juabensis
 †Ischyrotoma stubblefieldi
 †Isochilina
 †Isograptus
 †Isophragma – tentative report
 †Isorthis
 †Isoteloides
  †Isotelus
 †Isotelus copenhagenensis
 †Isotelus spurius
 †Ivanovia

J

 †Jedria
 †Jeffersonia
 †Jefina
 †Johnsonetes – report made of unidentified related form or using admittedly obsolete nomenclature
 †Johnsonetes filistriata
 †Juresania
 †Juresania ovalis – or unidentified comparable form
 †Juresania rectangularis – or unidentified comparable form

K

 †Kainella
 †Kainella flagricauda
 †Kalimnasphaera
 †Kalimnasphaera maculosa – or unidentified related form
 †Kallimorphocrinus
 †Kallimorphocrinus eaglei
 †Kanoshia
 †Kanoshia reticulata
 †Kaskia
 †Katuniella – tentative report
 †Kawina
 †Kawina wilsoni – type locality for species
 †Kazakhoceras
 †Kazakhoceras bylundi
 †Keriocyathus – type locality for genus
 †Keriocyathus arachnaius – type locality for species
 †Kindbladia
 †Kindbladia affinis
 †Kingopora
 †Kingopora ehrenbergi – or unidentified comparable form
 †Kingopora inflata – type locality for species
 †Kingopora wardlawiensa – type locality for species
 †Kistocare
 †Kistocare campbellensis – type locality for species
 †Kitikamispira
 †Kitikamispira minuitinodosa
 †Kleopatrina
 †Kleopatrina arcturusensis – type locality for species
 †Kleopatrina ftatateeta
 †Kleopatrina grandis
 †Kleopatrina magnifica
 †Kleopatrina simplex
 †Kloedenellitina – tentative report
 †Knightina
 †Knoxiella – tentative report
 †Kochaspis
 †Kochaspis augusta
 †Kochaspis liliana
 †Kochiella
 †Kochiella augusta
 †Kochiella brevaspis
 †Kochiella maxeyi
 †Kochiellina
 †Kochiellina groomensis
 †Kochiellina janglensis
 †Kochina
 †Kochina walcotti – type locality for species
 †Kochiproductus
 †Komaspidella
 †Komaspidella occidentalis – type locality for species
 †Kometia – tentative report
 †Komia
 †Komia eganensis
 †Komiella
 †Komiella magnasulca
 †Koneprusia
 †Konickophyllum
 †Koninckophyllum
   †Kootenia
 †Kootenia acicularis
 †Kootenia aculacauda – type locality for species
 †Kootenia brevispina
 †Kootenia convoluta
 †Kootenia crassa
 †Kootenia crassinucha – type locality for species
 †Kootenia dawsoni
 †Kootenia germana
 †Kormagnostella
 †Kormagnostella advena
 †Kozlowskia
 †Kozlowskia haydenensis
 †Kozlowskia kingi
 †Kozlowskia splendens
 †Kozlowskiellina
 †Kozlowwkiella
 †Kozlowwkiella lazarei
 †Krausella
 †Krotovia
 †Krotovia globosa – or unidentified related form
 †Krotovia knighti
 †Kutorginella
 †Kutorginella lasallensis
 †Kutorginella pseudantiquatonia – type locality for species
 †Kuvelousia
 †Kuvelousia leptosa
 †Kyrshabaktella

L

 †Labiostria
 †Labiostria westropi
 †Lachnostoma
 †Lachnostoma latucelsum
 †Ladatheca
 †Ladatheca cylindrica
 †Ladjia
 †Ladjia cordillera – type locality for species
 †Ladjia russelli
 †Ladjia saltica – or unidentified comparable form
 †Ladogioides
 †Ladogioides pax – or unidentified comparable form
 †Laeogyra – or unidentified comparable form
 †Lamellospira
 †Landercyathus – type locality for genus
 †Landercyathus lewandowskii – type locality for species
 †Laticrura
 †Laticrura heteropleura – or unidentified comparable form
 †Latiendothyra
 †Laurentoscandodus
 †Laurentoscandodus triangularis
 †Lebobienvillia
 †Leeites
 †Leeites leei – type locality for species
 †Lehua
 †Lehua argus – or unidentified related form
 †Leiorhynchus
 †Leiorhynchus carboniferum
 †Leiorhynchus hippocastanea
 †Leiorhynchus miriam
 †Leiorhynchus nevadensis – or unidentified comparable form
 †Leiorhynchus rhabdotum – or unidentified comparable form
 †Leiostegium
 †Leiostegium goodwinensis
 †Leiostrototropis – tentative report
 †Lensotreta – type locality for genus
 †Lensotreta perplexa – type locality for species
 †Leonardoceras
 †Leonardoceras parvum
  †Leonaspis
 †Leperditella
 †Leperditella incisa – or unidentified comparable form
 †Leperditella tumida – or unidentified comparable form
 †Leperditella valida
 †Lepetopsis
 †Lepetopsis franae – type locality for species
 †Lepidocyclus
 †Lepidoleptaena
 †Leptaena
 †Leptaena acuticuspidata – or unidentified comparable form
 †Leptaena ordovicica – or unidentified comparable form
 †Leptaenisca
 †Leptathyris
 †Leptathyris circula
 †Leptathyris index
 †Leptathyris obsolescens
 †Leptella
 †Leptella austrina – type locality for species
 †Leptella nevadensis
 †Leptellina
 †Leptellina occidentalis
 †Leptobolus – tentative report
 †Leptocoelia
 †Leptocoelia murphyi – type locality for species
 †Leptocoelina
 †Leptocoelina squamosa – type locality for species
 †Leptodesma
 †Leptomphalus
 †Leptomphalus arcturus – type locality for species
 †Leptostrophia
 †Leptostrophia beckii – or unidentified comparable form
 †Leptostrophia inequicostella
 †Lesueurilla
 †Leurosina
 †Leurosina sinesulca
 †Levenea
 †Levenea fagerholmi – type locality for species
 †Levenea navicula – type locality for species
 †Lichenaria
 †Licnocephala
 †Licnocephala cavigladius
 †Lidaconus – type locality for genus
 †Lidaconus palmettoensis – type locality for species
 †Limipecten
  †Lingula
 †Lingula carbonaria – or unidentified comparable form
  †Lingulella
 †Linipalus
 †Linipalus magnispinus – or unidentified related form
 †Linnarssonella
 †Linnarssonia
 †Linoproductus
 †Linoproductus ovata
 †Linoproductus planiventralis
 †Linoproductus prattenianus
 †Linoproductus prottenianus
 †Liocheina
 †Liricamera
 †Liricamera nevadensis
 †Lissatrypa – tentative report
 †Lissochonetes
 †Lissocoelia
 †Lissocoelia cylindrica – type locality for species
 †Lissocoelia ramosa
 †Listroa
 †Listroa toxoura
 †Lithostrotionella
 †Lithostrotionella castelnaui
 †Litocephalus
 †Litocephalus bilobatus
 †Litocephalus granulomarginatus
 †Litocephalus magnus
 †Litocephalus verruculapeza
 †Lobocorallium
 †Lobocorallium trilobatum
 †Lobosiphon
 †Lodanaria – report made of unidentified related form or using admittedly obsolete nomenclature
 †Lodanaria floryi
 †Loganograptus
 †Lomatopisthia – tentative report
   †Lonchodomas
 †Lophonema
 †Lophonema frydai
 †Lophophyllum – tentative report
 †Lophospira
 †Lophospira perangulata
 †Lotagnostus
 †Lotagnostus trisectus – or unidentified comparable form
 †Loxonema
 †Loxonema walcotti – type locality for species
 †Lunulazona
 †Lutulentus
 †Lutulentus muralspineus
 †Lyrielasma
 †Lytvophyllum – tentative report

M

 †Macannaia
 †Macannaia maladensis
 †Macgeea
 †Machaeraria
 †Mackenziecyathus
 †Mackenziecyathus bukryi
 †Macluritella – tentative report
 †Macluritella gyroceras – or unidentified comparable form
 †Maclurites
 †Maclurites magnus
 †Macrocyproides
 †Madaraspis
 †Madaraspis magnifica
 †Malayaspira
 †Malayaspira annulata
 †Malayaspira hintzei
 †Mametella
 †Manzanella
 †Marginia
 †Marginia ivanovae – or unidentified comparable form
 †Marginovatia
 †Marginovatia catinulus
 †Marginovatia eurekensis
 †Martinia
 †Martiniopsis – tentative report
 †Mauryella
 †Mccloudius
 †Mccloudius parvus – type locality for species
 †Mclearnites
 †Mclearnites invasor
 †Meekella
 †Meekella attenuata
 †Meekella striatocostata
 †Meekopinna
 †Meekopinna sagitta
 †Meekopora
 †Meekospira
 †Megakozlowskiella
 †Megakozlowskiella magnapleura – type locality for species
 †Megakozlowskiella raricosta – or unidentified comparable form
 †Megalaspidella – tentative report
  †Megalaspides
 †Megastrophia
 †Megastrophia iddingsi
 †Megastrophia transitans
  †Megistaspis
  †Meristella
 †Meristella robertsensis
 †Meristina
 †Merriamites
 †Merriamites eurekae
 †Mesodouvillina
 †Mesodouvillina varistriata – or unidentified comparable form
 †Mesolobus
 †Mesopholidostrophia – tentative report
 †Mesoschubertella
 †Mesoschubertella mullerriedi
 †Mesotrypa
 †Metabolograptus
 †Metabolograptus persculptus
  †Metacoceras
 †Metadimorphoceras
 †Metadimorphoceras richardsi – type locality for species
 †Metaldetes
 †Metaplasia
 †Metaplasia paucicostata – or unidentified comparable form
 †Metrionaxon
 †Mexicaspis
 †Mexicaspis difuntosensis
 †Mexicella
 †Mexicella antelopea
 †Mexicella grandoculus – tentative report
 †Mexicella granulata – type locality for species
 †Mexicella mexicana
 †Mexicella robusta
 †Mexicella stator
 †Michelinia
 †Michelinia meekana
 †Michelinoceras
 †Michelinoceras wilsoni
 †Microcardinalia
 †Microcheinella
 †Microcheinella peculiaris – or unidentified comparable form
 †Microdoma
 †Micromitra
 †Microplasma
 †Microryctocara
 †Microryctocara nevadensis
 †Milleratia – tentative report
 †Millerella
 †Millerella marblensis
 †Mimatrypa
 †Mimospira
 †Mimospira helmhackeri – or unidentified related form
 †Minervaecystis – tentative report
 †Minupeltis
 †Minupeltis conservator
 †Minycardita – type locality for genus
 †Minycardita sectilis – type locality for species
 †Missisquoia
 †Mizzia
 †Mizzia yabei – or unidentified comparable form
 †Moapacrinus
 †Moapacrinus inornatus
 †Moapacrinus rotundatus
 
 †Modiolus
 †Modiolus nevadensis
 †Modiomorpha – tentative report
 †Modiomorpha pintoensis
 †Molybdocyathus – type locality for genus
 †Molybdocyathus juvenilis – type locality for species
 †Monocraterion
  †Monograptus
 †Monograptus angustidens
 †Monograptus birchensis
 †Monograptus hercynicus
 †Monograptus thomasi
 †Monograptus uniformis
 †Monograptus yukonensis
 †Mononusphaericorhynchus
 †Mononusphaericorhynchus sartenaeri
 †Monotiopleura
 †Montezumaspis
 †Montezumaspis cometes
 †Montezumaspis parallela
 †Monticuliporella
 †Moorefieldella
 †Moorefieldella eurekensis
 †Mooreoceras
 †Morinorhynchus
 †Morosa
 †Morosa brevispina
 †Morosa definita
 †Morosa extensa
 †Morosa longispina
 †Morozoviella – type locality for genus
 †Morozoviella curriensis – type locality for species
 †Morozoviella praecurriensis – type locality for species
 †Moscovicrinus
 †Moscovicrinus bipinnatus
 †Mourlonia
 †Mourlonia type locality for species A – informal
 †Mucophyllum
 †Mucophyllum oliveri
 †Multicostella
 †Multioistodus
 †Multithecopora
 †Multithecopora hypatiae
 †Murchisonia
 †Murchisonia megathanae – type locality for species
 †Murchisonia tillesae – type locality for species
 †Mutationella – tentative report
 †Myalina
 †Mytilarca

N

 †Nadiastrophia
 †Nanicella
 †Nanillaenus
 †Nankinella
 †Nanorthis
 †Nanorthis hamburgensis
 †Nardophyllum
  †Naticopsis
 †Naticopsis glomerosa – type locality for species
 †Naticopsis inornata
 †Naticopsis kaibabensis
 †Neaxon
 †Neilsonia
 †Neilsonia welleri – or unidentified comparable form
 †Nemesa
 †Nemesa cimex – type locality for species
 †Neoarchaediscus
 †Neochonetes
 †Neochonetes acanthoporus
 †Neochonetes dominus
 †Neochonetes granulifer
 †Neoeridotrypella
 †Neoeridotrypella schilti – type locality for species
 †Neomphyma
 †Neomphyma karpinskiense
 †Neomphyma nevadense
 †Neomultithecopora
 †Neomultithecopora mccutcheonae – type locality for species
 †Neopanderodus
  †Neospirifer
 †Neospirifer cameratus
 †Neospirifer dunbari
 †Neospirifer gorei
 †Neospirifer goreii
 †Neospirifer latus – or unidentified comparable form
 †Neospirifer triplicatus
 †Neosyringopora
 †Neosyringopora multattenuata
 †Neozeacrinus
 †Neozeacrinus coronulus
 †Neozeacrinus wanneri
   †Nephrolenellus
 †Nephrolenellus geniculatus
 †Nephrolenellus greniculatus – type locality for species
 †Nervostrophia
 †Nevadacrinus
 †Nevadacrinus geniculatus
 †Nevadaspira – type locality for genus
 †Nevadaspira cooperi – type locality for species
 †Nevadatubulus – type locality for genus
 †Nevadatubulus dunfee – type locality for species
  †Nevadella
 †Nevadella eucharis
   †Nevadia
 †Nevadia parvoconica
 †Nevadia weeksi
 †Nevadoceras
 †Nevadoceras steelei – type locality for species
 †Nevadocoelia
 †Nevadocoelia grandis
 †Nevadocoelia pulchrata
 †Nevadocoelia traini
 †Nevadocoelia wistae
 †Newberria
 †Nicholsonella – tentative report
 †Nicklesopora
 †Nicklesopora avia
 †Nicolella – tentative report
 †Nicollidina
 †Nicollidina brevis
 †Nielsonia – or unidentified related form
 †Nileus
 †Nileus hesperaffinis
 †Nileus scrutator – or unidentified related form
 †Niobe
 †Niobe quadraticaudata – or unidentified comparable form
 †Niobella
 †Nisusia – tentative report
 †Noblella
 †Noblella tremadociensis – type locality for species
 †Normalograptus
 †Normalograptus ajjeri
 †Normalograptus angustus
 †Normalograptus elegantulus
 †Normalograptus extraordinarius
 †Normalograptus myrniensis
 †Normalograptus ojsuensis
 †Nothorthis – tentative report
 †Notopeltis
 †Notopeltis orthometopa
 †Nucleospira
 †Nucleospira subsphaerica – type locality for species
 †Nuculavus
 †Nuculavus levatiformis
 †Nuculoidea
 †Nuculopsis
 †Nuculopsis darlingensis – or unidentified comparable form
 †Nuculopsis girtyi
 †Nuculopsis levatiformis
 †Nuia
 †Nyctopora
 †Nyella
 †Nyella clinolimbata
 †Nyella granosa
 †Nyella immoderata
 †Nyella plana
 †Nyella rara

O

  †Obolella
 †Obolus
 †Odontospirifer
 †Odontospirifer type locality for species A – informal
 †Oepikina
   †Ogygopsis
 †Ogygopsis batis
 †Ogygopsis typicalis
 †Oistodus
 †Oistodus contractus
 †Oistodus lanceolatus – or unidentified comparable form
 †Oklahomacrinus
 †Oklahomacrinus triangulus
 †Olenaspella
 †Olenaspella paucisegmenta
 †Olenaspella regularis
 †Olenaspella separata – type locality for species
    †Olenellus
 †Olenellus chiefensis – type locality for species
 †Olenellus clarki
 †Olenellus fowleri – type locality for species
 †Olenellus fremonti – or unidentified comparable form
 †Olenellus gilberti
 †Olenellus howelli
 †Olenellus multinodus
 †Olenellus puertoblancoensis – tentative report
 †Olenellus terminatus – type locality for species
   †Olenoides
 †Olenoides maladensis
 †Olenoides steptoensis – type locality for species
 †Olenus
 †Olenus wilsoni
 †Oligometopus
 †Oligometopus contractus
 †Ollenellus
 †Ollenellus gilberti
 †Omphalocirrus – tentative report
 †Omphalotrochus
 †Onchocephalites
 †Onchocephalites claytonensis – type locality for species
 †Onchocephalus
 †Onchocephalus maior – or unidentified comparable form
 †Onchocephalus major – or unidentified comparable form
 †Onchocephalus palupus – type locality for species
 †Oncochilus
 †Onuphlonella – tentative report
 †Onychoplecia – tentative report
 †Ophioxenikos
 †Ophioxenikos langenheimi
 †Opikina
 †Opipeuter
 †Opisthotreta
 †Opisthotreta indistincta – type locality for species
 †Opisthotreta transversa – type locality for species
 †Opsiosoryctocephalus – type locality for genus
 †Opsiosoryctocephalus ophis – type locality for species
 †Orbiculoidea
 †Orbiculoidea capuliformis
 †Orbiculoidea missouriensis
 †Orbiculoidea moorefieldana – or unidentified related form
 †Orecopia
 †Orecopia mccoyi
 †Oriostoma
 †Oriostoma gerbaulti
 †Oriskania
 †Orthambonites
 †Orthambonites bifurcatus
 †Orthambonites decipiens – or unidentified comparable form
 †Orthambonites dinorthoides
 †Orthambonites eucharis
 †Orthambonites mazourkaensis – or unidentified comparable form
 †Orthambonites minisculus
 †Orthambonites minusculus
 †Orthambonites patulus
 †Orthambonites paucicostatus
 †Orthambonites subulata
 †Orthidiella
 †Orthidiella carinata
 †Orthidiella costellata
 †Orthidiella extensa
 †Orthidiella longwelli
 †Orthidium
 †Orthidium bellulum
 †Orthidium fimbriatum – or unidentified related form
 †Orthis
  †Orthoceras
 †Orthograptus
 †Orthograptus calcaratus
 †Orthograptus truncatus
 †Orthonema
 †Orthonychia
 †Orthonychia occidens
 †Orthoretiolites
 †Orthoretiolites hami
 †Orthostrophella
 †Orthostrophella monitorensis – type locality for species
 †Orthostrophia
 †Orthotetes
 †Orthotetes kaskaskiensis
 †Orthotetes occidentalis
 †Orthotichia – tentative report
 †Orthovertella
 †Orulgania
 †Oryctocephalina
 †Oryctocephalina maladensis – tentative report
 †Oryctocephalites
 †Oryctocephalites claytonensis – type locality for species
 †Oryctocephalites palmeri
 †Oryctocephalites rasettii
 †Oryctocephalites runcinatus
 †Oryctocephalites typicalis
 †Oryctocephalus
 †Oryctocephalus americanus – type locality for species
 †Oryctocephalus indicus
 †Oryctocephalus maladensis
 †Oryctocephalus nyensis
 †Oryctocephalus orientalis
 †Oryctocephalus primus
 †Otarion
    †Ottoia
 †Ottoseetaxis
 †Oulodus
 †Oulodus rohneri
 †Oulodus ulrichi
 †Ovatia
 †Ovatia latior – or unidentified comparable form
 †Ovatia nodosa
 †Ovatoryctocara – tentative report
 †Oxoplecia
 †Oxoplecia monitorensis
 †Oxoplecia nevadensis
 †Oxyspira – type locality for genus
 †Oxyspira murphyi – type locality for species
 †Ozarkodina
 †Ozarkodina hassi
 †Ozarkodina oldhamensis – tentative report
 †Ozarkodina raaschi
 †Ozarkodina tenuis – or unidentified comparable form

P

 †Pachyaspis
 †Pachyaspis gallagari – type locality for species
 †Pachyaspis longa – type locality for species
 †Pachyconulus
 †Pachyconulus parvalus
 †Pachydictya
 †Pachyfavosites
 †Pachyphyllum
 †Pachystrophia
 †Pacificocoelia
 †Pacificocoelia infrequens
 †Paeckelmanella
 †Paedeumias
 †Paedeumias granulatus – type locality for species
 †Paedeumias nevadensis – tentative report
 †Paenebeltella
  †Pagetia
 †Pagetia arenosa
 †Pagetia clytia
 †Pagetia maladensis
 †Pagetia mucrogena
 †Pagetia prolata
 †Pagetia resseri
 †Pagetia rugosa
 †Paladin
 †Palaeocapulus
 †Palaeocapulus piso
 †Palaeocyclus
 †Palaeocyclus eurylophus
 †Palaeoneilo
 †Palaeoneilo mcchesneyana
 †Palaeophippium
 †Palaeophippium octaramosum – type locality for species
 †Palaeophyllum
 †Palaeosphaera – type locality for genus
 †Palaeosphaera micra – type locality for species
 †Palaeostylus
 †Palaeotextularia
 †Palaeotextularia consobrina – or unidentified loosely related form
 †Palaeotrifidus – type locality for genus
 †Palaeotrifidus ballator – type locality for species
 †Palaeotrifidus imbifurcus – type locality for species
 †Palaeotripus
 †Palaeotripus sexabrachiatus – type locality for species
 †Paleofavosites
 †Paleoneilo
 †Palliseria – type locality for genus
 †Palliseria longwelli – type locality for species
 †Palliseria robusta
 †Palmettaspis – type locality for genus
 †Palmettaspis consorta – type locality for species
 †Palmettaspis lidensis
 †Palmettaspis parallela – type locality for species
 †Paltodus
 †Pamchonetes
 †Pamchonetes macrostriatus
 †Panacus – type locality for genus
 †Panacus palmeri – type locality for species
 †Pancus – type locality for genus
 †Pancus palmeri – type locality for species
 †Panderodus
 †Panderodus feulneri
 †Panderodus unicostatus
 †Pandorinellian
 †Pandorinellian linguiformis
 †Pandorinellina
 †Pandorinellina angustinpennatus – or unidentified comparable form
 †Pandorinellina angustipennatus – or unidentified comparable form
 †Pandorinellina exigua
 †Pandorinellina expansa
 †Pandorinellina linguiformis
 †Pandorinellina steinhornensis
 †Papiliophyllum
 †Papiliophyllum murphyi
 †Papiliophyllum vescum
 †Paraantagmus
 †Paraantagmus latus
 †Parabellefontia
 †Parabellefontia concinna – or unidentified comparable form
 †Parabolablastus
 †Parabolablastus elongatus – type locality for species
 †Parabolinella
 †Parabolinella hecuba
 †Parabolinella tumifrons – or unidentified comparable form
 †Paracaligelloides
 †Parachaetes
 †Parachonetes
 †Parachonetes macrostriatus
 †Paraconularia
 †Paracrothyris
 †Paracyclas
 †Parafafallotaspis
 †Parafallotaspis
 †Parafusulina
 †Paragloborilus
 †Paraheritschioides
 †Paraheritschioides californiense
 †Paraheritschioides fergusonensis – type locality for species
 †Paraheritschioides grandis
 †Paraheritschioides nevadaensis – type locality for species
 †Paraheritschioides stevensi
 †Parahousia
 †Parahousia constricta
 †Parahousia subequalis
 †Parahystricurus
 †Parajuresania
 †Parajuresania nebrascensis
 †Paralbertella
 †Paralbertella bosworthi
 †Paralbertella bosworthy
 †Paralenorthis
 †Paralenorthis marshalli
 †Parallelodon
 †Parallelodon truncatus – or unidentified related form
 †Paramillerella
 †Paramillerella inflecta
 †Paramillerella pressa
 †Paranacyathus
 †Paranevadella
 †Paraorthograptus
 †Paraorthograptus pacificus
 †Paraorthograptus uniformis
 †Paraparchites
 †Paraparchites cyclopeus – or unidentified related form
 †Paraparchites nickelsi – or unidentified comparable form
 †Paraperrinites
 †Paraperrinites subcumminsi – type locality for species
 †Parapholidostrophia – type locality for genus
 †Parapholidostrophia harperi – type locality for species
 †Paraplegmatograptus
 †Paraplegmatograptus uniformis
 †Paraporcellia
 †Paraporcellia rohri
 †Parapoulsenia
 †Parapoulsenia lata – or unidentified comparable form
 †Parapugnax
 †Parapugnax bactrianense – type locality for species
 †Pararachnastraea
 †Pararachnastraea illipahensis – type locality for species
 †Pararachnastraea moormanensis – type locality for species
 †Parareteograptus
 †Parareteograptus parvus
 †Parareteograptus sinensis
 †Parareteograptus turgidus
 †Pararhizophyllum – type locality for genus
 †Pararhizophyllum parvulum – type locality for species
 †Paraschmidtella – tentative report
 †Parastringocephalus
 †Parastrophina – tentative report
 †Parathuramina
 †Paratikhinella
 †Parechidnina
 †Parechidnina nevadensis – type locality for species
 †Parenthatia
 †Parethelocrinus
 †Parethelocrinus rectilatus
 †Pareuloma
 †Parkaspis
 †Parkaspis drumensis
 †Parkula
 †Parkula esmeraldina – type locality for species
 †Paroistodus – tentative report
 †Patellispongia
 †Patellispongia brosiusae – type locality for species
 †Patellispongia oculata
 †Paterina
 †Paterula
 †Paterulus
 †Patriaspirifer
 †Patriaspirifer kobehana
 †Paucicostella – tentative report
 †Paucicrura
 †Paucicrura cristifera
 †Paucicrura subplana – or unidentified comparable form
 †Paucispinifera – tentative report
  †Peachella
 †Peachella iddingsi
 †Peelerophon – tentative report
 †Pegmarhynchia
  †Pelagiella
 †Pelekygnathus
 †Pelekygnathus linguiformis
 †Pelekygnathus parawebbi
 †Pelekygnathus pseudofoliatus
 †Pelekygnathus xylus
 †Pelekysgnathus
 †Pelekysgnathus angustipennatus
 †Pelekysgnathus eiflius
 †Pelekysgnathus intermedius
 †Pelekysgnathus linguiformis
 †Pelekysgnathus parawebbi
 †Pelekysgnathus pseudofoliatus
 †Pelekysgnathus robusticostatus
 †Pelekysgnathus trigonicus
 †Peltabellia – tentative report
 †Peniculauris
 †Peniculauris ivesi
 †Penniretepora
 †Penniretepora oppositus
 †Penniretepora trilineata
 †Pentamerella
 †Pentamerella davidsoni – or unidentified comparable form
 †Pentamerella wintereri
 †Pentamerifera
 †Pentameroides
  †Pentamerus
 †Pentaxocrinus
 †Pentaxocrinus quinarius
 †Pentlandella
 †Pentlandia
 †Pentlandia merriami – type locality for species
  †Pentremites
 †Peraspis
 †Peraspis erugata
 †Pericyclus
 †Pericyclus antelopensis – type locality for species
 †Pericyclus filaris
 †Perimestocrinus
 †Perimestocrinus nevadensis
 †Perimestocrinus oasis
 †Periodon
 †Periodon aculeatus – tentative report
 †Perischoclonus
 †Perissopliomera
 †Perissopliomera maclachlani
 †Perissopyge
 †Perissopyge triangulata
 †Permastraea
 †Permastraea biseptata – type locality for species
 †Permastraea buttensis – type locality for species
 †Permastraea campophylloides
 †Permastraea nevadensis – type locality for species
 †Permocalculus
 †Permophorus
 †Pernopecten
  †Peronopsis
 †Peronopsis amplaxis
 †Peronopsis bonnerensis
 †Peronopsis brighamensis
 †Peronopsis fallax
 †Peronopsis segmenta
 †Perspicaris
 †Peruvispira
 †Peruvispira boreala – type locality for species
 †Petalaxis
 †Petalaxis elyensis – type locality for species
 †Petalaxis exiguus
 †Petalaxis mokomokensis – type locality for species
 †Petalaxis occidentalis
 †Petalocystites
 †Petasmatherus
 †Petasmatherus type locality for species A – informal
 †Petigurus
 †Petigurus inexpectatus
 †Petrochus
 †Petschoracrinus – tentative report
   †Phacops
 †Phalacroma
 †Phanocrinus – tentative report
 †Phanocrinus insolitus
 †Phenacocyclas
 †Phestia
 †Phestia perumbonata
 †Phillipsia
 †Phillipsia peroccidens
 †Pholidostrophia
 †Phormograptus
 †Phormograptus conectus
 †Phormograptus connectus
 †Phragmodus
 †Phragmodus undatus
  †Phragmophora
 †Phragmorthis
 †Phragmorthis antiqua – type locality for species
 †Phragmostrophia
 †Phragmostrophia merriami – type locality for species
 †Phrenophoria
 †Phrenophoria type locality for species A – informal
 †Phrenophoria type locality for species B – informal
 †Phricodothyris
 †Phricodythyris
 †Phricodythyris perplexa
 †Phrycodothyris
 †Phrycodothyris perplexa
 †Phyllocystis
 †Phyllodictya
 †Phyllodictya crystallaria – or unidentified comparable form
  †Phyllograptus
 †Phyllograptus anna
 †Physalidopisthia – tentative report
 †Picnotreta
 †Picnotreta lophocracenta
 †Pilekia – tentative report
 †Pinctus
 Pinna
 †Pinna innexpectans
 †Pinnatulites
 †Pinyonastraea
 †Piochella
 †Piochella peasleensis
 †Plagioglypta
 †Plagiura
 †Plagiura extensa
 †Plagiura minor
 †Plagiura retracta
 †Planoarchaediscus
 †Platuzona – or unidentified comparable form
 †Platybolbina
   †Platyceras
 †Platyceras trojani – type locality for species
  †Platycrinites
 †Platycrinus – tentative report
 †Platyschisma
  †Platystrophia
 †Platyterorhynchus
 †Platyterorhynchus russelli
 †Platyworthenia
 †Platyzona
 †Plaxocrinus
 †Plaxocrinus piutae
 †Plectatrypa
 †Plectatrypa imbricata – or unidentified comparable form
 †Plectelasma
 †Plectelasma type locality for species A – informal
 †Plectelasma type locality for species B – informal
 †Plectodina
 †Plectodina florida
 †Plectodina tenuis
 †Plectogyra
 †Plectogyra irregularis
 †Plectogyra tumesepta
 †Plectogyra tumula
 †Plectorthis
 †Plectorthis obesa
 †Plectorthis perplexus
 †Plectotrophia – tentative report
 †Pleiopleurina
 †Pleiopleurina anticlastica
 †Plethopeltis
 †Plethopeltis arbucklensis – or unidentified comparable form
 †Plethoschisma
 †Plethoschisma grandis
  †Pleurocystites
 †Pleurograptus
 †Pleurograptus lui
 †Pleurorima
 †Pleurorima hoffmannae – type locality for species
 †Pleurorthis
 †Pleurorthis beattyensis
 †Pleurosiphonella
 †Plicatolina
 †Plicocyathus
 †Plicocyathus rozanovi
 †Plicoplasia
 †Plicoplasia cooperi
 †Pliomeroides
 †Pliomerops
 †Pliomerops canadensis – or unidentified comparable form
 †Plummericrinus
 †Plummericrinus bulbosus
 †Plummericrinus jelli
 †Polidevcia
 †Polidevcia arctura – type locality for species
 †Polidevcia bellistriata
 †Polidevcia obesa
 †Poliella
 †Poliella denticulata
 †Poliella germana
 †Poliella leipalox – type locality for species
 †Poliella leipolox
 †Poliella lomataspis
 †Poliella ovala
 †Poliella prima – or unidentified comparable form
 †Poliellaites
 †Poliellaites gloriosa
 †Politicurus – tentative report
 †Politicurus politus – or unidentified related form
 †Polusocrinus
 †Polusocrinus amplus
 †Polygnathus
 †Polygnathus abbessensis
 †Polygnathus angusticostatus
 †Polygnathus angustipennatus – or unidentified comparable form
 †Polygnathus bagialensis
 †Polygnathus benderi
 †Polygnathus bultyncki
 †Polygnathus costatus
 †Polygnathus damelei – type locality for species
 †Polygnathus eiflius
 †Polygnathus gronbergi
 †Polygnathus holynensis – type locality for species
 †Polygnathus linguiformis
 †Polygnathus parawebbi
 †Polygnathus pseudofoliatus
 †Polygnathus robertensis – type locality for species
 †Polygnathus salixensis – type locality for species
 †Polygnathus serotinus
 †Polyplucograptus
 †Polypora
 †Polypora keyserlingiformis – type locality for species
 †Polypora remota
 †Polypora sargaensis
 †Polyporella
 †Polyporella helgersonia – type locality for species
 †Polythalamia – type locality for genus
 †Polythalamia americana – type locality for species
 †Pontisia
 †Pontisia boodi
 †Porcellia
 †Porcellia denayi
 †Poronileus
 †Poronileus fistulosus
 †Poronileus vallancei
 †Porosublastus
 †Porosublastus inexpectus
 †Posidonia
 †Posidonia becheri
 †Poteriocrinites
 †Poteriocrinites permicus
 †Praedaraelites
 †Praedaraelites loeblichi
 †Praenatica
 †Praewaagenoconcha
 †Prasopora
 †Prehousia
 †Prehousia alata
 †Prehousia impolita
 †Prehousia indenta
 †Prehousia prima
 †Prehousia semicircularis
 †Presbynileus
 †Presbynileus ibexensis
 †Primaspis
 †Prioniodina – tentative report
 †Priscella
 †Proaulopora
 †Prodentalium
 †Prodentalium canna
 †Productella
 †Proehmaniella
 †Proehmaniella hebes – tentative report
  †Proetus
 †Profallotaspis – tentative report
 †Profusulinella
 †Profusulinella copiosa
 †Profusulinella decora
 †Prolecanites
 †Prolecanites lyoni
 †Promytilus
 †Proplina
 †Proplina propina – or unidentified comparable form
 †Protathyris
 †Protathyris hesperalis
 †Protocalymene
 †Protocalymene mcallesteri
 †Protochonetes
 †Protochonetes elyensis – type locality for species
 †Protocortezorthis
 †Protocortezorthis windmillensis – type locality for species
 †Protoentactinia
 †Protoentactinia gracilispinosa – type locality for species
 †Protoentactinia latospinosa – type locality for species
 †Protoentactinia minuta – type locality for species
 †Protopanderodus
 †Protopanderodus insculptus
 †Protopharetra
 †Protopharetra arcybata – type locality for species
 †Protopharetra junensis
 †Protopliomerops
 †Protopresbynileus
 †Protopresbynileus glaber – or unidentified comparable form
 †Protopresbynileus wildeni
 †Protospongia
 †Protospongia conica
 †Protospongia spina – type locality for species
 †Prototreta
 †Protowentzelella
 †Protowentzelella cystosa – type locality for species
 †Protowentzelella kunthi – type locality for species
 †Protowentzelella variabilis – type locality for species
 †Protozyga – tentative report
 †Psalikilus
 †Psalikilus pikum
 †Psephosthenaspis
 †Psephosthenaspis ellipsepyga
 †Psephosthenaspis glabrior
 †Psephosthenaspis pseudobathyurus
 †Pseudagnostus
 †Pseudagnostus communis
 †Pseudagnostus contracta – type locality for species
 †Pseudagnostus josephus
 †Pseudedriophus
 †Pseudedriophus guensburgi
 †Pseudoammodiscus
 †Pseudoatrypa – tentative report
 †Pseudoatrypa percrassa
 †Pseudobatostomella
 †Pseudobatostomella irregularis – type locality for species
 †Pseudobelodina
 †Pseudobelodina inclinata
 †Pseudobelodina kinki
 †Pseudobelodina vulgaris
 †Pseudocybele
 †Pseudocybele altinasuta
 †Pseudocybele lemurei
 †Pseudocybele nasuta
 †Pseudocystophora
 †Pseudocystophora complexa
 †Pseudoendothyra
 †Pseudofusulinella
 †Pseudofusulinella dunbari
 †Pseudofusulinella jeffordsi – type locality for species
 †Pseudofusulinella pusilla – type locality for species
 †Pseudofusulinella rotunda
 †Pseudohystricurus
 †Pseudokingstonia
 †Pseudokingstonia exotica
 †Pseudomera
 †Pseudomera arachnopyge
 †Pseudomera barrandei
 †Pseudomonotis
 †Pseudoneotodus
 †Pseudoneotodus beckmanni
 †Pseudoneotodus mitratus
 †Pseudoolenoides
 †Pseudoolenoides acicaudus
 †Pseudoolenoides dilectus – or unidentified comparable form
 †Pseudooneotodus
 †Pseudooneotodus mitratus
 †Pseudoparazyga
 †Pseudoparazyga cooperi
 †Pseudoreichelina
 †Pseudorthoceras
 †Pseudosaratogia
 †Pseudosaratogia abnormis
 †Pseudosaratogia leptogranulata
 †Pseudostaffella
 †Pseudostaffella needhami
 †Pseudosyrinx
 †Pseudosyrinx desiderata
 †Pseudotaxis
 †Pseudovermiporella
 †Pseudozaphrentoides
 †Pseudozaphrentoides hanseni
 †Pseudozaphrentoides trojana – type locality for species
 †Pseudozygopleura
 †Ptarmiganoides
 †Ptarmiganoides araneicauda – type locality for species
 †Ptarmiganoides crassaxis
 †Ptarmiganoides hexacantha
 †Ptarmiganoides lepida – tentative report
 †Ptarmiganoides propinqua
 †Pterinopecten
 †Pterinopecten spio
 †Pterocephalia
 †Pterocephalia concava
 †Pterocephalia elongata
 †Pterocephalia punctata
 †Pterocephalia sanctisabae
  †Ptychagnostus
  †Ptychagnostus atavus
 †Ptychagnostus intermedius
 †Ptychagnostus seminula
 †Ptychomphalina
 †Ptychomphalina type locality for species – informal
 †Ptychophyllum – tentative report
 †Ptychopleurella
 †Ptychopleurites
 †Ptychopleurites bevifrons – or unidentified comparable form
 †Ptyocephalus
 †Ptyocephalus accliva
 †Ptyocephalus vigilans
 †Pugilator
 †Pugilator deckeri
 †Punctaparchites
 †Punctospirifer
 †Punctospirifer gnomus – type locality for species
 †Punctospirifer kentuckensis
 †Punctospirifer kentuekyensis
 †Punka
 †Punka caecata
 †Pycnostylus

Q

 †Quadratia
 †Quadratia hirsutiformis
 †Quadratonucula
 †Quadratonucula stella – type locality for species
 †Quadricarina
 †Quadricarina glabrobasis
 †Quadricarina type locality for species A. – informal
 †Quadrithyris
 †Quadrithyris minuens – or unidentified comparable form
 †Quadrithyris vijaicus – or unidentified comparable form
 †Quadrochonetes
 †Quadrochonetes type locality for species A – informal
 †Quasimodaspis
 †Quasimodaspis brentsae

R

 †Radiastraea
 †Radiastraea arachne
 †Radiastraea nevadensis
 †Radiastrea
 †Radiatrypa
 †Radiatrypa advena
 †Radiatrypa klukasi
 †Rafinesquina
 †Raphistoma
 †Raphistoma gubanovi
 †Raymondaspis
 †Raymondaspis vespertina
 †Raymondella
 †Raymondella nevadensis
 †Raymondensis – tentative report
 †Raymondites – tentative report
 †Rayonnoceras
    †Receptaculites
 †Rectifenestella
 †Rectifenestella cordiretiformis – type locality for species
 †Rectifenestella tenax
 †Rectograptus
 †Rectograptus abbreviatus
 †Remopleurides
 †Remopleurides similus – or unidentified comparable form
 †Remopleurides simulus – or unidentified comparable form
 †Renalcis
 †Rensselaeria
 †Rensselaerina
 †Rensselandia
 †Rensselandia cloudi – type locality for species
 †Repinaella
 †Resserella
 †Reteporidra
 †Reteporidra anaphora
 †Reticulariina
 †Reticularina
 †Reticularina campestris
 †Reticularina spinosa
 †Reticulariopsis
 †Retilamina
 †Retilamina debrennei
 †Retispira
 †Retispira albapinensis
 †Retispira nolani – type locality for species
 †Rhabdiferoceras – type locality for genus
 †Rhabdiferoceras annuliferum – type locality for species
 †Rhabdocyclus
 †Rhabdocyclus depressus
 †Rhabdomeson
 †Rhipidomella
 †Rhipidomella carbonaria
 †Rhipidomella elyensis
 †Rhipidomella nevadensis
 †Rhipidothyris
 †Rhipidothyris circo – type locality for species
 †Rhizophyllum
 †Rhizophyllum inornatum
 †Rhombifera
 †Rhombopora
 †Rhombopora cornwallis
 †Rhombotrypella
 †Rhombotrypella regularis
 †Rhombotrypella sunfloweria
 †Rhynchocamara
 †Rhynchocamara breviplicata – or unidentified comparable form
 †Rhynchocamara sublaevis
 †Rhynchopora
 †Rhynchopora taylori
 †Rhynchospirina
 †Rhynoleichus
 †Rhynoleichus weeksi
 †Rhysostrophia
 †Rhysostrophia nevadensis
 †Rhysostrophia occidentalis
 †Rhyssochonetes
 †Rhyssochonetes solox
 †Rimmyjimina
 †Rioceras – tentative report
 †Robergia
 †Robergiella
 †Rossaspis
 †Rossoceras
 †Rossodus – tentative report
 †Rossodus tenuis
 †Rostranteris
 †Rostranteris type locality for species A – informal
 †Rotopericyclus
 †Rotopericyclus pinyonensis – type locality for species
 †Roundya
 †Rousseauspira
 †Rousseauspira teicherti
 †Ruedemannoceras
 †Rugatia
 †Rugatia occidentalis – or unidentified comparable form
 †Rugocoelia – type locality for genus
 †Rugocoelia eganensis – type locality for species
 †Rugosochonetes

S

 †Sabellidites
 †Sabellidites canadiensis
 †Saffordophyllum
 †Sagittodontus
 †Sagittodontus robustus – tentative report
 †Sallya
 †Salopina
  †Salterella
 †Sandolasma
 †Sandolasma buttense – type locality for species
 †Sandolasma elegans
 †Sandolasma hillae – type locality for species
 †Sandolasma perplexa – type locality for species
 †Sanguinolites
 †Sanguinolites salteri
 †Sansabella – tentative report
 †Scabbardella
 †Scabbardella altipes
 †Scandodus
 †Scandodus unicostatus
 †Scaphorthis
 †Sceptropora
 †Sceptropora faculum
 †Schedexocrinus
 †Schistometopus
 †Schizambon
 †Schizodus
 †Schizodus curtiformis
 †Schizodus semistriatus – or unidentified comparable form
 †Schizophoria
 †Schizophoria depressa
 †Schizophoria fascicostella – or unidentified comparable form
 †Schizophoria mcfarlanei
 †Schizophoria nevadaensis
 †Schizophoria parafragilis – type locality for species
 †Schizophoria simpsoni
 †Schizophoria texana
 †Schizoporia
 †Schizoporia resupinoides
 †Schizoporia texana
 †Schmidtella
 †Schmidtites – tentative report
 †Schubertella
 †Schubertella kingi
 †Schuchertella
 †Schwagerina
 †Schwagerina jeffordsi – type locality for species
 †Schwagerina munda – type locality for species
 †Schwagerina rotunda
 †Scinocephalus
 †Scinocephalus solitecti – or unidentified related form
 †Sciophyllum
 †Scolopodus
 †Scolopodus insculptus
 †Scotiaecystis – tentative report
 †Scotoharpes
 †Secuicollacta
 †Secuicollacta stelligera – type locality for species
 †Selenimyalina
 †Semizona
 †Semizona glindmeyeri
 †Septabrunsiina
 †Septaglomospiranella
 †Septatrypa
 †Septimyalina
 †Septimyalina burmai
 †Septopora
 †Septopora alternata
 †Septopora bilateralis
 †Serpulospira
 †Serpulospira annulatus – or unidentified comparable form
 †Serpulospira swickae
 †Severella
 †Shamovella
 †Shastalasma
 †Shastalasma woodi – type locality for species
 †Shoshonorthis
 †Shoshonorthis swanensis – or unidentified comparable form
 †Shumardia
 †Shumardia exopthalmus
 †Siderocyathus – type locality for genus
 †Siderocyathus duncanae – type locality for species
 †Sieberella
 †Sieberella problematica – or unidentified comparable form
 †Sieberella pyriforma – type locality for species
 †Sigmocheilus
 †Sigmocheilus flabellifer
 †Sigmocheilus grata
 †Sigmocheilus notha
 †Sigmocheilus pogonipensis
 †Simulolenus
 †Simulolenus granulatus
 †Simulolenus quadrisulcatus
 †Sinotubuites
 †Sinotubuites cienegensis
 †Sinuites
  †Siphonodendron
 †Siphonodendron sinousum – or unidentified comparable form
 †Siphonodendron sinuosum – or unidentified comparable form
 †Siphonodendron whitneyi – or unidentified comparable form
 †Siphonodendrum
 †Siphonodendrum sinuosum – or unidentified comparable form
 †Sivorthis
 †Sivorthis eucharis
 †Sivorthis occidentalis
 †Skenidioides
 †Skenidioides oklahomensis
 †Skenidium
 †Skenidium asellatum – or unidentified comparable form
 †Skippella
 †Soleniscus
 †Sowerbyella
 †Sowerbyella merriami
 †Sowerbyella perplexa – or unidentified comparable form
 †Sowerbyites
 †Spathognathodus
 †Spathognathodus minutus – or unidentified comparable form
 †Spencia
 †Spencia quadrata – type locality for species
 †Sphaerirhynchia
  †Sphaerocodium
 †Sphaerocoryphe
 †Sphenosteges
 †Sphenosteges hispidus
  †Sphenothallus
 †Sphenotreta
 †Sphenotreta sulcata – or unidentified comparable form
 †Spinatrypa
 †Spinatrypa aspera – or unidentified comparable form
 †Spinatrypa soetenica – or unidentified comparable form
 †Spinatrypina
 †Spinatrypina angusticostata
 †Spinatrypina comitata – or unidentified comparable form
 †Spinatrypina lamellosa
 †Spinatrypina recula – type locality for species
 †Spinella
 †Spinella talenti – type locality for species
 †Spinoplasia
 †Spinoplasia roeni – type locality for species
 †Spinulicosta
 †Spinulicosta muirwoodi
  †Spirifer
 †Spirifer arkansanus – or unidentified comparable form
 †Spirifer centronatus
 †Spirifer haydenianus – or unidentified related form
 †Spirifer occidus
 †Spirifer opimus
 †Spirifer pellaensis – tentative report
 †Spirifer rockymontanus
 †Spiriferella
 †Spiriferella scobina – type locality for species
 †Spiriferellina
 †Spiriferellina campestris
 †Spiriferellina ceres
 †Spiriferellina lata
  †Spiriferina
 †Spirigerina
 †Spirigerina supramarginalis
 †Spirinella
 †Spirinella pauciplicata
 †Spirocyathella – tentative report
 †Spirocyathella microporosa – type locality for species
 †Spirodentalium
 †Spirodentalium walcotti – type locality for species
  Spirorbis
 †Spongophyllum
 †Spygoria – type locality for genus
 †Spygoria zappania – type locality for species
 †Squamaria
 †Squameofavosites
 †Stachyodes
 †Staffella
 †Staffella expansa
 †Staufferella
 †Stauromatidium
 †Stegnopsis
 †Stegocoelia
 †Stelechophyllum – tentative report
 †Stellahexaformis – type locality for genus
 †Stellahexaformis gersterensis – type locality for species
 †Stellarocrinus
 †Stellarocrinus comptus
 †Stellarocrinus cuneatus
 †Stenambon
 †Stenambon megagranulus
 †Stenambon paucigranulus
 †Stenodiscus
 †Stenodiscus murdockensis – type locality for species
 †Stenoglaphyrites
 †Stenoglaphyrites hesperius
 †Stenoglaphyrites merriami
 †Stenoloron
 †Stenoloron minor
 †Stenopecrinus – tentative report
 †Stenopecrinus xerophilus
 †Stenopora
 †Stenopora parvaexozona – type locality for species
 †Stenothecoides
 †Stephenaspis
 †Stephenaspis avitus – type locality for species
 †Stephenaspis highlandensis
 †Stereodictyum
 †Stereodictyum proteron – type locality for species
 †Stereolasma
 †Stereostylus
 †Stereostylus compressum
 †Stibaraster
 †Stictoporella
    †Stigmaria
 †Stigmaria wedingtonensis
 †Strachanognathus
 †Strachanognathus parvus
 †Straparollus
 †Straparollus caementarius
 †Straparollus lonemountainensis
 †Straparollus spergenensis – or unidentified related form
 †Streblochondria
 †Streblopteria
 †Streblopteria similis
 †Streblotrypa
 †Streblotrypa elongata – type locality for species
 †Streptacis
 †Streptelasma
 †Streptelasma prolongatum
 †Streptognathodus
 †Streptognathodus unicornis
 †Streptorhynchus
 †Streptosolen
 †Streptosolen mccafferyi – type locality for species
 †Streptosolen nodosus – type locality for species
 †Streptosolen occidentalis
 †Strianematina
 †Striatifera
 †Striatopora
 †Strigambitus
 †Strigambitus bilobus
 †Strigambitus transversus
 †Strigambitus utahensis
 †Strigigenalis
  †Stringocephalus
 †Stringocephalus nevadensis – type locality for species
 †Strobeus
 †Stromatopora
 †Strombodes
 †Stropheodonta
 †Stropheodonta filicosta
 †Stropheodonta magnacosta – type locality for species
 †Stropheodontida
 †Strophochonetes
   †Strophomena
 †Strophonella
 †Strophonella bohemica – or unidentified comparable form
 †Strophonella punctulifera – or unidentified comparable form
 †Strophostylus
 †Strophostylus nevadensis – type locality for species
 †Strophostylus tantillus – type locality for species
 †Stuartwellercrinus
 †Stuartwellercrinus corbatoi
 †Stummelasma
 †Stummelasma antelopense
 †Stummelasma lonense
 †Stummelasma sulfurense – type locality for species
 †Stygina – tentative report
 †Styliolina
 †Stylonema – tentative report
 †Stylopleura
 †Stylopleura berthiaumi
 †Stylopleura nevadensis
 †Styracograptus
 †Styracograptus mississippiensis
 †Styracograptus tatianae
 †Subrensselandia
 †Subrensselandia nolani
 †Subrensselendia
 †Subretepora
 †Subulites
 †Sulcoretepora
 †Sulcoretepora corticata
 †Sulcoretepora irregularis
 †Sychnoelasma
 †Sychnoelasma alrichanum – or unidentified comparable form
 †Sychnoelasma ulrichanum – or unidentified comparable form
 †Symphysurina
 †Symphysurina walcotti
 †Synarmocrinus
 †Synarmocrinus brachiatus – type locality for species
 †Syndielasma
 †Syndielasma biseptatum
 †Syngastrioceras
 †Synprioniodina – tentative report
 †Syntrophina – tentative report
 †Syntrophopsis
 †Syntrophopsis polita
 †Synyphocrinus
 †Synyphocrinus permicus
 †Syringaxon
  †Syringopora
 †Syringopora surcularia
 †Syringostroma
 †Syspacephalus
 †Syspacephalus crassus
 †Syspacephalus laticeps – or unidentified comparable form
 †Syspacephalus longus
 †Syspacephalus uncus – tentative report
 †Syspacephalus variosus – type locality for species

T

 †Tabulipora
 †Tabulipora carbonaria – type locality for species
 †Tabulipora hispida
 †Tabulophyllum
 †Taenora
 †Taenora expansa
 †Tancrediopsis
 †Tancrediopsis cuneata – or unidentified related form
 †Taphrodonta
 †Taphrodonta parallela
 †Tapinotomaria
 †Tecnocyrtina
 †Tecnocyrtina fissiplicata
 †Tecnocyrtina missouriensis
 †Tegerocyathus
 †Tegerocyathus edelsteini
 †Teichertina
 †Teichertina americana – type locality for species
 †Teichertina fitzroyensis
 †Teiichispira
 †Teiichispira auricula – type locality for species
 †Telephina
 †Temnocheilus
 †Temnophyllum
 †Temnophyllum waltheri – type locality for species
   †Tentaculites
  †Tetragraptus
 †Tetragraptus bigsbyi
 †Tetraprioniodus – tentative report
 †Tetraprioniodus costatus
 †Tetrataxis
 †Tetrataxis angusta
 †Texacrinus
 †Texacrinus distortus
 †Thamniscus
 †Thamniscus erraticus – type locality for species
 †Thamnopora
 †Thamnopora limitaris
 †Thamnosia
 †Thamnosia depressa
  †Thoracocare
 †Thoracocare idahoensis
 †Tikhinella
 †Timaniella
 †Timaniella pseudocamerata – or unidentified comparable form
 †Timanodictya
 †Timanodictya dichotoma – or unidentified comparable form
 †Toernquistia – tentative report
 †Tonkinaria
 †Tonkinaria simpsoni
 †Tonkinella
 †Tonkinella breviceps
 †Tonkinella valida
 †Tonopahella – type locality for genus
 †Tonopahella goldfieldensis – type locality for species
 †Toquimaella
 †Toquimaella kayi – type locality for species
 †Toquimaphyllum
 †Toquimaphyllum johnsoni
 †Toquimaphyllum sentum – type locality for species
 †Toquimaphyllum vulgare – type locality for species
 †Toquimia
 †Toquimia kirki
 †Tortodus
 †Tortodus australis
 †Tortodus kockelianus
 †Torynifer
 †Torynifer internascens – or unidentified comparable form
 †Totiglobus – type locality for genus
 †Totiglobus nimius – type locality for species
 †Trachycheilus
 †Trachycheilus whirlwindensis
 †Trachydomia
 †Trachyspira
 †Trampidocrinus
 †Trampidocrinus bellicus
 †Trampidocrinus phiola
 †Trematopora
 †Trematorthis
 †Trematorthis tenuis
 †Trematospira
 †Trematospira perforata
 †Trepospira
    †Triarthrus
 †Trichonodella
 †Trichonodella barbara – or unidentified comparable form
 †Trigonirhynchia
 †Trigonirhynchia occidens
 †Trigonocerca
 †Trigonocerca typica
 †Trigrammaria
  †Trinodus
 †Tritoechia
 †Tritoechia sinuata
 †Trocholites
 †Trochonema – tentative report
 †Tropidodiscus
 †Trupetostroma
 †Tryplasma
 †Tryplasma duncanae
 †Tryplasma radicula
 †Tschussovskenia
 †Tschussovskenia connorsensis – type locality for species
 †Tschussovskenia dilata
 †Tuberitina
 †Tumicephalus
 †Tumicephalus depressus
 †Turbonitella
 †Turbonitella biserialis – or unidentified related form
   †Tuzoia
 †Tyersella
 †Tylonautilus
 †Tylothyris
 †Tympanuella
 †Tympanuella transversa

U

 †Ufimia
 †Undispirifer
 †Uraloceras
 †Uraloceras burtiense
 †Uraloceras involutum
 †Uraloceras nevadense – type locality for species
 †Uromystrum
 †Uromystrum validum – or unidentified comparable form
 †Ursinella – type locality for genus
 †Ursinella major – type locality for species
 †Utharocrinus

V

 †Vagrania
 †Vagrania gronbergi
 †Valcourea
 †Valcourea intracarinata
 †Valcourea plana
 †Valcourea transversa
 †Vallomyonia
 †Vallomyonia claudiae
 †Vallomyonia devonica
 †Varatrypa
 †Vargania
 †Vargania gronbergi
 †Variatrypa
 †Variatrypa exoleta
 †Variatrypa licta – type locality for species
 †Varvia – tentative report
 †Verpaspongia – type locality for genus
 †Verpaspongia nodosa – type locality for species
 †Verticillopora
 †Vesiculophyllum
 †Vesperispira – type locality for genus
 †Vesperispira humboldtiana – type locality for species
 †Vidronovella
 †Vidronovella fastigiata
 †Virgiana
 †Virgiana utahensis – type locality for species
 †Volocephalina
 †Volocephalina connexa
 †Volocephalina variosa – type locality for species
 †Volocphalina
 †Volocphalina variosa – type locality for species

W

 †Waagenella
 †Waagenella vespertinus – type locality for species
 †Waagenites
 †Waagenites type locality for species A – informal
 †Waagenites type locality for species B – informal
 †Waagenoconcha – tentative report
 †Walliserodus
 †Walliserodus amplissimus
 †Walliserodus curvatus
  †Wanneria
 †Wanneria walcottana – or unidentified comparable form
 †Warburgella
 †Warburgella rugulosa
 †Warrenella
 †Warrenella franklinii
 †Warrenella kirki
 †Warrenella nevadensis
 †Warrenella occidentalis
 †Warrenella plicata
 †Warrenella praekirki
 †Watsonella
 †Weirchellatia
 †Wellerella
 †Wellerella delicatula – or unidentified comparable form
 †Wellerella osagensis
 †Wellerella truncata
 †Wendoverella – type locality for genus
 †Wendoverella arca – type locality for species
 †Wenkchemnia
 †Wenkchemnia sulcata
 †Wenkchemnia walcotti
 †Westergaardites
 †Westmontia
 †Westmontia devilensis
 †Weyerides – tentative report
 †Whittingtonia – tentative report
 †Wilberrya
 †Wilberrya fragilis
 †Williamicyathus
 †Wilsonastraea
 †Wilsonastraea fraseri – type locality for species
 †Wilsonastraea parva – type locality for species
 †Wilsonastraea smithi
 †Wimanella – tentative report
 †Winchellatia
 †Wjatkella
 †Wjatkella hemiseptifera – type locality for species
 †Wjatkella permiana
 †Worthenia
 †Worthenia corrugata
 †Wujiajiania
 †Wujiajiania sutherlandi
 †Wutinoceras
 †Wutinoceras huygenae – or unidentified comparable form

X

 †Xenelasma – tentative report
 †Xenocheilos
 †Xenocheilos granulosus
 †Xenostegium
 †Xenostegium franklinense – or unidentified comparable form
 †Xestotrema
 †Xestotrema pulchrum – type locality for species
 †Xystocrania
 †Xystocrania perforator
 †Xystocrania pyriformis – type locality for species

Y

 †Yakovlevia
 †Yakovlevia multistriata – type locality for species
 †Yinograptus
 †Yinograptus disjunctus
 †Yochelsonospira
 †Yochelsonospira tenuilineata
 Yoldia
 †Youngia – tentative report
 †Yuknessaspis
 †Yuknessaspis benningtonis
 †Yunnania

Z

 †Zacanthoides
 †Zacanthoides alatus – or unidentified comparable form
 †Zacanthoides demissus
 †Zacanthoides divergensis
 †Zacanthoides variacantha
 †Zacanthoides walapai
 †Zacanthopsina – type locality for genus
 †Zacanthopsina eperephes – type locality for species
 †Zacanthopsis
 †Zacanthopsis contractus – type locality for species
 †Zacanthopsis levis
 †Zelophyllum – tentative report
 †Zonophyllum
 †Zonophyllum lonense
 †Zonophyllum robertsense
 †Zygognathus
 †Zygospira

References

 

Paleozoic
Life
Nevada